= Bianco world map =

15th-century map created by Andrea Bianco

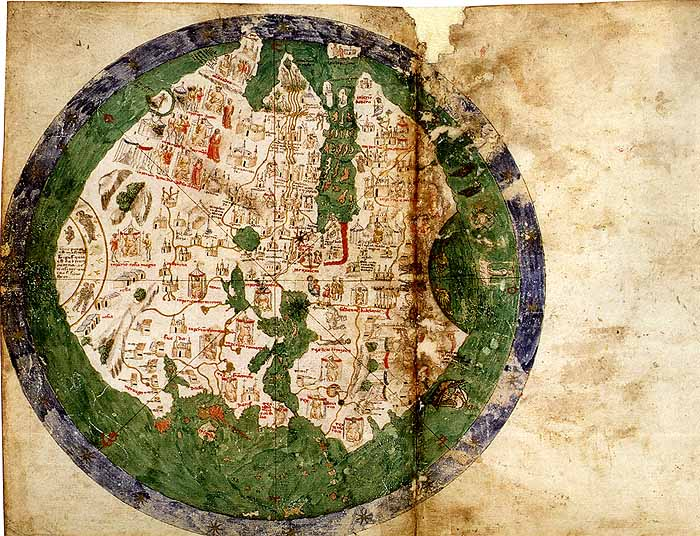
The Bianco map (1436)

The Bianco World Map is a map created by Andrea Bianco, a 15th-century Venetian sailor and cartographer who resided on Chios. This map was a large piece of a nautical atlas including ten pages made of vellum (each measuring 26 × 38 cm). These vellum pages were previously held in an 18th-century binding, but the current owner, Venetian library Biblioteca Marciana, separated the pages for individual exhibition.

To confirm his authorship of the atlas, Bianco added to the first page a signature flag with the text "Andreas Biancho de Veneciis me fecit M cccc xxx vj". Roughly translated, this reads "Made by me Andreas Biancho in Venice, 1436."

Andrea Bianco also collaborated with Fra Mauro on the Fra Mauro world map of 1459.

== Content ==
The first page, or Tavola 1, shows a diagram of the Raxon or Toleta of Marteloio, a navigational technique that enabled sailors to calculate how to return to their intended course after being blown off-course. The next eight pages contain seven local and one Europe-wide Portolan charts. The ninth page contains a circular world map measuring 24 cm in circumference. The final page illustrates a Ptolemaic world map based upon Ptolemy's first projection with a graduation of the latitudes. The map also contains two different estimates of the size of the world sphere.

== See also ==
- Ancient world maps
