= Rutter (nautical) =

Mariner's handbook of written sailing directions

A rutter is a mariner's handbook of written sailing directions. Before the advent of nautical charts, rutters were the primary store of geographic information for maritime navigation.

It was known as a periplus ("sailing-around" book) in classical antiquity and a portolano ("port book") to medieval Italian sailors in the Mediterranean Sea. Portuguese navigators of the 16th century called it a roteiro, the French a routier, from which the English word "rutter" is derived. In Dutch, it was called a leeskaart ("reading chart"), in German a Seebuch ("sea book"), and in Spanish a derrotero.

== History ==
Before the advent of nautical charts in the 14th century, navigation at sea relied on the accumulated knowledge of navigators and pilots. Plotting a course at sea required knowing the direction and distance between point A and point B. Knowledge of where places lay relative to each other was acquired by mariners during their long experience at sea.

The earliest peripluses of classical antiquity were not necessarily written as practical navigational handbooks. Some were more akin to an adventure travelogue, to celebrate a famous voyage. Others were disguised as such, notably the Periplus of Pseudo-Scylax from the 4th century BCE, which described the harbors and landmarks along the north African coast west of the Nile Delta. Still others were designed as commercial guides for merchants, such as the Periplus of the Erythraean Sea, written around 100 CE by a Greek merchant in Egypt, as a guide to the market ports of the Red Sea and Indian Ocean.

The re-emergence of maritime commerce in the Mediterranean Sea during the Middle Ages (12th–13th centuries), spearheaded by Italian ports like Amalfi, Pisa, Genoa and Venice, led to the rise of a new set of handbooks, known as portolani ("port books"), designed for the practical use of mariners. These were likely first compiled by professional mariners and pilots, probably as a mnemonic set of notes for their own personal use. These notes were probably passed secretly within their profession ranks, from master to apprentice. Only a few of these Italian handbooks were made public, and even fewer have survived to this day. The most complete surviving portolano is the famous Il compasso da navigare, written c. 1250 and published in Genoa in 1296.

In their sailing instructions, Medieval portolan handbooks distinguished between various types of routes, e.g. per starea (coastal cabotage), per peleggio (open-sea sailing between two points). Portolan handbooks expressed their sailing directions in terms of compass rose points and distances. The reliance on the magnetic compass (an instrument that only really began being used for navigation in the 13th century,) distinguishes the Medieval portolano from the earlier Classical periplus.

It is believed that the nautical charts that suddenly emerged in Genoa, Venice, Majorca and other maritime centers after the late 13th century were constructed from the written information contained in contemporary written pilot handbooks, hence the term portolan charts. The wealth of detail contained in portolano handbooks is reflected in the portolan charts, stunningly accurate even by modern standards.

Handbooks often contained a wealth of information beyond sailing directions. For instance, they frequently had detailed physical descriptions of shorelines, harbors, islands, channels, notes about tides, landmarks, reefs, shoals and difficult entries, instructions on how to use navigational instruments to determine position and plot routes, calendars, astronomical tables, mathematical tables and calculation rules (notably the rule of marteloio), lists of customs regulations at different ports, medical recipes, instructions on ship repair, etc. As a result, the nautical chart never fully replaced the handbook, but remained supplementary to it.

Among notable rutters is the Grand Routier, written by the French pilot Pierre Garcie, c. 1483 and published in 1502–03, which focused on the shores of the Bay of Biscay and the English Channel, and its peculiarities. Translated into English as the Rutter of the Sea in 1528, it was reprinted many times, and remained the pre-eminent rutter used by English sailors for decades.

Another frequently used rutter was the work Portolano by Pietro Coppo, published in Venice in 1528, which included a collection of sea charts and the description of Christopher Columbus's discovery of America. Coppo was among the last to consider North America an archipelago.

Perhaps the most dramatic rutter was the 1595 Reysgheschrift by Dutch sailor Jan Huygen van Linschoten. Having sailed to Asia aboard Portuguese ships, Linschoten publicized the sailing directions (roteiros) to the East Indies that had been assiduously kept secret by the Portuguese for nearly a century. The publication of Linschoten's rutter was a sensation, and it launched the race by Dutch and English companies for the East Indies.

== Notable rutters ==
- Periplus of Pseudo-Scylax (4th century BCE, Greek)
- Periplus of the Erythraean Sea (100 CE, Egyptian Greek)
- Periplus of the Euxine Sea (160 CE, by Arrian, Greek)
- Liber de existencia riveriarum et Forma Maris Nostri Mediterranei (c. 1160–1200, Pisan)
- Il compasso da navigare (1296, Genoese)
- Grant Routtier et pilotage de la mer (c. 1483, by Pierre Garcie, French)
- Cornaro Atlas (c. 1489, Venetian)
- Das Seebuch (late 15th century, published by Karl Koppmann, Low German)
- Esmeraldo de Situ Orbis (c. 1509, by Duarte Pacheco Pereira, Portuguese)
- 'Paston's Rutter' (c. 1468), the earliest English-language rutter, preserved in London, British Library, MS Lansdowne 285, fols 136–40.
- Arabic nautical corpus (late 15th–early 16th century) including the works of Aḥmad ibn Mājid and Sulaymān al-Mahrī, on all technical aspects of stellar navigation throughout the Indian Ocean.
- Livro de Marinharia (c. 1514, by João de Lisboa, Portuguese)
- Spieghel der Zeevaerdt (1584-1585), by Lucas Janszoon Waghenaer
- Reysgheschrift vande navigatien der Portugaloysers in Orienten (1595, Jan Huygen van Linschoten, Dutch).

== See also ==
- Periplus
- Portolan chart
- Roteiro (navigation)

== Sources ==
- Aczel, A. D. (2001). The Riddle of the Compass: the invention that changed the world. New York: Harcourt.
- Brown, L. A. (1979) [1949]. The Story of Maps. New York: Dover.
- Campbell, T. (1987). "Portolan charts from the late thirteenth century to 1500" (PDF). In Harley, J. B.; Woodward, D. (eds.). The History of Cartography. Vol. 1: Cartography in Prehistoric, Ancient, and Medieval Europe and the Mediterranean. Chicago: University of Chicago Press. pp. 371–463. Archived from the original (PDF) on 2011-11-05.
- Campbell, T. (2011). "A critical re-examination of early portolan charts with a reassessment of their replication and seaboard function". Archived from the original on 2024-03-21.
- Cotter, C. H. (1983). "A Brief History of Sailing Directions". Journal of Navigation. 36 (2): 249–251. doi:10.1017/S0373463300024966.
- Edson, E. (2007). The World Map, 1300–1492: the persistence of tradition and transformation. Baltimore, MD: The Johns Hopkins University Press.
- Koeman, C. (1985). "Jan Huygen van Linschoten". Revista da Universidade de Coimbra. 32: 27–47.
- Lanman, J. T. (1987). On the Origin of Portolan Charts. Chicago: Newberry.
- Markham, A. H., ed. (1880). The Voyages and Works of John Davis, the Navigator. London: Hakluyt.
- Nordenskiöld, Adolf Erik (1897). Periplus: An Essay on the Early History of Charts and Sailing Directions. Translated by Bather, Frances A. Stockholm: Norstedt.
- Parry, J. H. (1981) [1963]. The Age of Reconnaissance: Discovery, exploration and settlement, 1450 to 1650. Berkeley: University of California Press.
- Schmidt, B. (2001). Innocence Abroad: the Dutch imagination and the New World, 1570–1670. Cambridge: Cambridge University Press.
- Stevenson, E. L. (1911). Portolan charts; their origin and characteristics: with a descriptive list of those belonging to the Hispanic society of America. New York: Knickerbocker Press.
- Taylor, E. G. R. (1951). "The Oldest Mediterranean Pilot". Journal of Navigation. 4 (1): 81–85. doi:10.1017/S0373463300048785.
- Taylor, E. G. R. (1971) [1956]. The Haven-Finding Art: A history of navigation from Odysseus to Captain Cook. London: Hollis and Carter.
- Waters, D. W. (1985). "English navigational books, charts and globes printed down to 1600". Revista da Universidade de Coimbra. 33: 239–257.
