= Cornaro Atlas =

Venetian collection of nautical charts and tracts

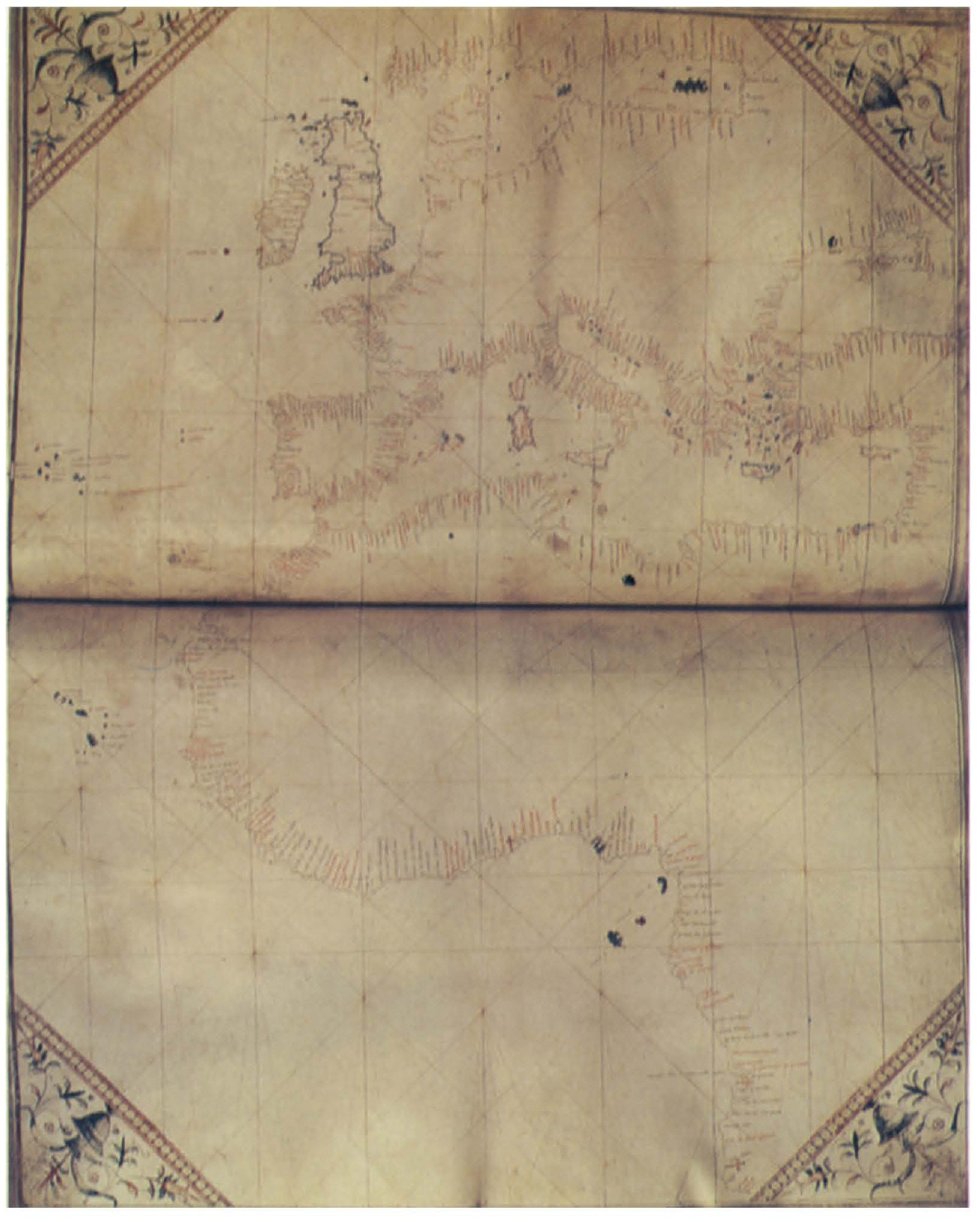
Summary map (p.36) of the Cornaro Atlas

The Cornaro Atlas (Egerton MS 73) is an extensive Venetian collection (c. 1489) of nautical charts and tracts, currently held in the Egerton Collection of manuscripts of the British Library.

== Background ==
The Cornaro Atlas is an 80-page Venetian manuscript volume, estimated to date c. 1489. It is named after the Cornaro family, one of the leading patrician families of the Republic of Venice, who once owned the volume, and whose coat of arms adorns its frontispiece. The Cornaro Atlas was brought to England in 1832, and is currently held (Egerton MS 73) by the British Library in London.

The first half of the volume contains a large collection of nautical charts, faithful copies of portolan charts composed earlier in the 15th century. The second half of the volume is dedicated to a myriad of written tracts on matters of nautical interest (e.g. astronomy, sailing directions, tariffs, etc.)

== Contents of the Atlas ==
The Cornaro atlas has around 80 pages, each page at 53 x 41 cm.

=== Calendars ===
Three of the pages are calendars:

- (p. 1) – a perpetual astronomical calendar of lunar revolutions
- (p. 2) – a calendar of moveable feasts from 1489 to 1600
- (p. 79) – a calendar of Dominical letters.

=== Nautical charts ===
Following the opening calendars, there are 38 nautical charts depicted in 35 pages (numbered p. 3 to p. 38). All the maps seem to have been copied around the same time and by the same hand. Several pages can be grouped together to form a single portolan chart covering the "normal portolan" range (Black Sea, Mediterranean and Atlantic coast up to the British isles). Most cartographers are named, some of them notables, such as Grazioso Benincasa of Ancona and Petrus Rosell of Majorca, others are lesser known. The last few charts are anonymous. Notable in this collection are the final charts on West Africa ("Portuguese Guinea") by an anonymous cartographer (often attributed to Cristoforo Soligo), which seem to be based on a Portuguese nautical chart. It is one of the few indicators of the existence of Portuguese portolans from before the earliest extant specimens.

- (3 + 4) – portolan chart of Petrus Rosell
  - p. 3 – chart of east Mediterranean and Black Sea
  - p. 4 – chart of west Mediterranean and Atlantic coast
- (5 + 6) – portolan chart of Giovanni de Napoli (Zuan de Napoli)
  - p. 5 – east Mediterranean and Black Sea.
  - p. 6 – west Mediterranean and Atlantic coast
- (7 + 8) – portolan chart of Grazioso Benincasa
  - p. 7 – east Mediterranean and Black Sea
  - p. 8 – west Mediterranean and Atlantic coast
- (p. 9) – two charts on one page:
  - the first is a special map of the Black Sea by Grazioso Benincasa (or F. Beccario)
  - the second is a special map of the Black Sea by Francesco Beccario.
- (10 + 11) – portolan chart of Francesco Beccario
  - p. 10 – East Mediterranean and Black Sea
  - p. 11 – West Mediterranean and Atlantic Coast. Notable here is the "ixolla del Brazil" (mythical Brasil) west of Ireland, followed by "ixolla damam" (mythical Isle of Mam), then the usual list of Azores names (corvi marini, etc.)
- (12 + 13 + 14) – portolan chart of Nicolò Fiorino
  - p. 12 – East Mediterranean and Black Sea
  - p. 13 – Central Mediterranean
  - p. 14 – West Mediterranean and Atlantic coast. Notable here is a rare mythical island "Mons Orins" west of Ireland, as well as the usual mythical del brazil to the southwest. It also gives the customary Azores list (deli corbi marini, degli conigli, de S. Zorzi, etc. including a second de bracil (Terceira))
- (p. 15) – special map of the Adriatic Sea by Francesco de Cesanis ("Cexano").
- (p. 16) – several charts on one page by Zuan Soligo,
  - map of Italy, the Adriatic and the Ionian islands
  - map of Sicily and Corsica
- (17 + 18) – portolan chart of Alvise de Cesanis ("Alvise Cexano")
  - p. 17 – Black Sea
  - p. 18 – eastern mediterranean, including Aegean up to Morea.
- (19 + 20) – special charts of Domenico de Zane
  - p. 19 – chart of Mediterranean
  - p. 20 – chart of the Aegean Sea
- (21 + 22) – special charts of Grazioso Benincasa
  - p. 21 – chart of the Mediterranean
  - p. 22 – chart of the Aegean Sea, including Greece and Asia Minor.
- (p. 23) – chart of the Aegean Sea by Nicolò Pasqualini
- (p. 24) – chart of the Aegean Sea by Benedetto Pesina, explicitly dated 1489 (the only dated map in the atlas).
- (25 + 26 + 27 + 28 + 29) – portolan chart of Alvise Cesanis (noted as "compimento" of earlier Cexano chart).
  - p. 25 – central Mediterranean (from where chart on p. 18 left off) until Livorono
  - p. 26 – west Mediterranean until the Balearic islands.
  - p. 27 – west Mediterranean and south Atlantic coast
  - p. 28 – north Atlantic coast, from Lisbon to Texel.
- (p. 29) map of Atlantic coast, from northwest Africa to British isles, by an anonymous cartographer.
- (p. 30) – South Atlantic chart by Cristoforo Soligo, Portugal down to Cape Verde, and including the Canary Islands, Madeira, Azores and mythical Antillia. Notable for including both the "traditional" 14th-century names and the new Portuguese 15th-century names for the Azores islands, specifically:
  - y de luovo and y de santa maria (Santa Maria)
  - y caprara and y de san michiel (São Miguel)
  - y del brazil and y de jhs xpo (Terceira)
  - y de san zorzi and y de san piero (São Jorge)
  - y de colonbi and y de san dinis (Pico)
  - y de la venture and y de salvis (Faial)
  - no traditional name and y gracioxa (Graciosa)
  - y deli Conilgi and y de san tomas (Flores)
  - y di corbi marini and ya de santa ana. (Corvo)
- (31 + 32 + part of 33) – Map of west African coast (noted as "Ginea Portogalexe", or Portuguese Guinea) by an anonymous cartographer (often attributed to Christoforo Soligo)
  - (p. 31) – from the Straits of Gibraltar to Cape Vert (Senegal)
  - (p. 32) – from Cape Roxo to Cape Saint-Catherine (Gabon), depicting construction of Elmina Castle ("Qui se defiando uno altro Castello del Re de portogal")
  - (p. 33, top) – from Cape Fremoxo to Cape Negro, with all the toponyms in Portuguese.
- (p. 33 bottom) – map of the Caspian Sea (Mar de Bacu), anonymous.
- (p. 34) is a blank page.
- (p. 35) two maps on one page, both anonymous
  - top – map of the Black Sea
  - bottom – map of the Aegean Sea
- (p. 36) – General portolan chart (Mediterranean, Black Sea, Atlantic coast), possibly to serve as a "summary map" of all the prior charts. Anonymous.
- (p. 37) – map of northern Germany ("Sea of Germany") and the Baltic Sea. Anonymous.
- (p. 38) – a chorographic map of the Holy Land (entitled: "Descriptio totius Terre Sancte, quam posiderunt filii Israhel; vocatur etiam Terra Promisionis"). Similar to the map of the Marino Sanuto atlas.

=== Tracts ===
The remaining forty pages of the Cornaro Atlas (pp. 39–78) are various tracts, lists and notes on various subjects, written in the Venetian language.

- (pp. 39 to 46) are dedicated to astrology and astronomy. Discusses matters such as the relation of the stars to parts of the human body, instructions on the course of the sun and moon, eclipses, timing of Easter and feast days, etc. (the content is similar to the Catalan Atlas of 1375 and the Pinelli–Walckenaer Atlas of 1384)
- (p. 47) is a chapter entitled la raxon del martologio relating the rule of marteloio (similar to Andrea Bianco's 1436 atlas).
- (p. 48), there is the replica of a 1428 document Venetian captain-general Andrea Mocenigo listing the captains of the Venetian galleys, followed (p. 49), by an ordered list of armed galleys of the government (Signoria) of Venice, and (p. 50) a list of the captains of the Flanders galleys.
- (p. 52) beginning of a new treatise on astronomy, apparently dated 1388, tracing the movement of the twelve zodiac constellations, the seven planets, the moon, etc.
- (p. 55) an explanation of how to measure the height of buildings.
- (p. 59) a list of tariffs on merchandise in different countries, comparative to the tariffs of Alexandria.
- (p. 63) is a manual on sailing.
- (p. 67 to p. 78) is a detailed portolan handbook detailing the sailing directions and distances of the various ports of the Mediterranean and the Atlantic coasts, albeit apparently left incomplete.
- (p. 79) – the final calendar of Dominical letters.

== See also ==
- Egerton 2803 maps, a later Italian portolan atlas in the Egerton Collection

== Sources ==
- Entry on the Cornaro Atlas at COPAC, British Library
- Campbell, T. (2010) "A Note on the Cornaro Atlas" online, including a color and attribution table.
- D'Avezac, M.A.C. (1850) Note sur un Atlas Hydrographique manuscrit, executé à Venise dans le XVe siècle, et conservé aujourd'hui au Musée Britannique Paris: Martinet online
- Uzielli, G. and P. Amat di S. Filippo (1882) Studi biografici e bibliografici sulla storia della geografia in Italia, Vol. 2 – Mappamondi, carte nautiche, portolani ed altri monumenti cartografici specialmente italiani dei secoli XIII–XVII, Rome: Società geografica italiana, 2nd ed., Vol. 2
