= Andrea Bianco =

Italian navigator and cartographer

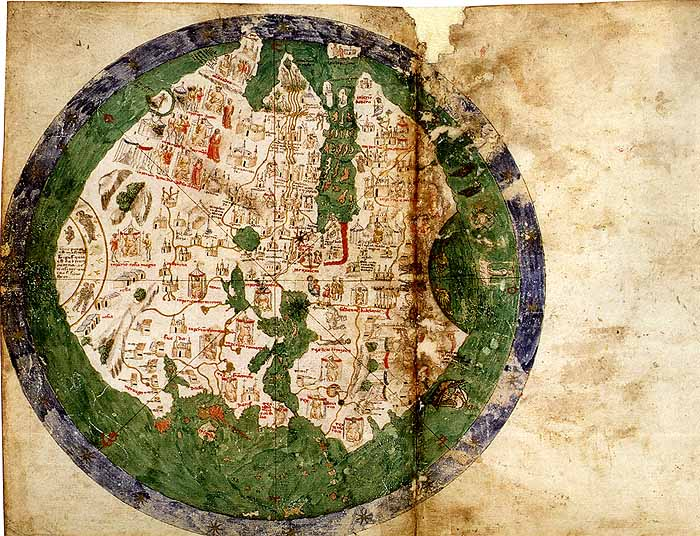
Bianco World Map (1436)

Andrea Bianco (15th century, Venice — 15th century, Venice) was an Italian navigator and cartographer who resided on Chios.

Andrea Bianco was a Venetian whose activities can be traced from 1436 to 1459. He is the author of both the Bianco world map (in 1436), in the Biblioteca Marciana, and another Portolan map in 1448, consisting of two parts, kept in the Biblioteca Ambrosiana. The indication of a year was not the rule on maps in this period. However, the latter dating is considered certain, as he states on this map that he drew it in London in that year.

The Bianco World Map is part of an atlas whose ten pages are made of vellum, measuring 29 × 38 cm. It is considered to be the first extant cartographic work depicting the Portuguese discovery of Cape Verde. On the ninth page is the world map, shown opposite.

Andrea Bianco is also considered to have worked with Fra Mauro, who is considered an even more important cartographer of his time.

Bianco is the subject of the historical fiction book The Mapmaker (1957) by Frank G. Slaughter.

== Bibliography ==
- Codazzi, Angela (1968). "Bianco, Andrea". Dizionario Biografico degli Italiani (in Italian). Vol. 10: Biagio–Boccaccio. Rome: Istituto dell'Enciclopedia Italiana. ISBN 978-88-12-00032-6.
- Erich Woldan (1983). "Bianco, Andrea". Lexikon des Mittelalters, II: Bettlerwesen bis Codex von Valencia (in German). Stuttgart and Weimar: J. B. Metzler. col. 38. ISBN 3-7608-8902-6.
- "Atlante nautico (1436)".(1993) edited by Piero Falchetta, Arsenale Editrice srl, Venezia. ISBN 88-7743-135-0 This book is a special edition for the Banco San Marco and was a limited edition of 1500 copies. The Biblioteca Marciana has made the text and 10 Tavola's available as ARCHIweb-Risultati Ricerca::Family 029110.
