= Portolan chart =

Nautical charts, first made in the 13th century

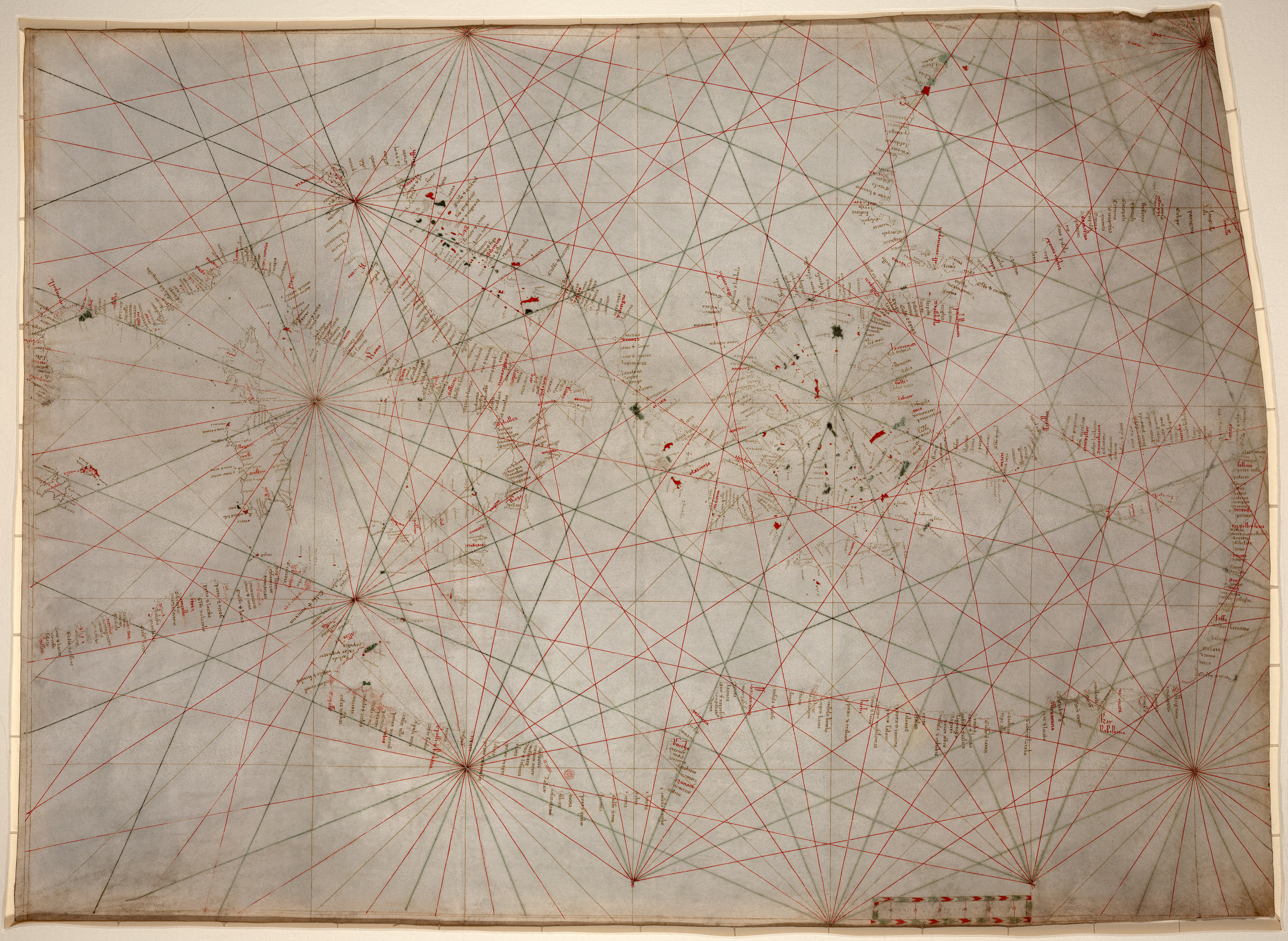
A portolan nautical chart of the Mediterranean Sea, second quarter of the 14th century. Kept in the Library of Congress, where it is the oldest original cartographic artifact.

Portolan charts are the earliest known type of nautical charts, and the oldest known examples were made in the late 13th and early 14th centuries in the Mediterranean region, usually displaying the areas between the Atlantic coasts of Western Europe and Northwestern Africa to the west and the Black Sea to the east. Besides those showing the entire area on a single map field, there are also portolan charts that show smaller territorial extents, either as separate editions or as a series of charts that together form portolan atlases.

The word portolan comes from the Italian portolano, meaning "related to ports or harbors", and which since at least the 17th century designates "a collection of sailing directions".

Portolan charts are manuscript charts rendered using ink on vellum sheets and are easily recognizable by their distinct visual characteristics, such as a content focus on coastal regions, networks of colour-coded straight lines emanating from one or more centres in 32 directions, linear scale bars calibrated in so-called portolan miles (miglio), and place names inscribed perpendicular to the coastline contours. Their most perplexing features are the extremely realistic portrayal of coastlines and a complete historical lack of their evolutionary path because the oldest known samples have already been made to a highly developed stage, and later-made charts and atlases have not become more accurate over time.

== Terminology ==
The term "portolan chart" was coined in the 1890s because at the time it was assumed that these maps were related to portolani, medieval or early modern books of sailing directions. Other names that have been proposed include "rhumb line charts", "compass charts" or "loxodromic charts" whereas modern French scholars prefer to call them just "nautical charts" to avoid any relationship with portolani.

Several definitions of portolan chart coexist in the literature. A narrow definition includes only medieval or, at the latest, early modern sea charts (i.e. those that primarily focus on sea basins and coastlines, leaving the depictions of inland areas with little or no content) that include a network of rhumb lines and do not show any indication of the use of spherical coordinates, i.e. latitudes and longitudes . The geographic extent of these mostly medieval portolan charts is limited to the Mediterranean and Black Seas with possible extensions to West European coasts up to Scandinavia and West African coasts down to Guinea. Some authors further restrict the term "portolan chart" to single-sheet maps drawn on parchment, whereas late medieval and early modern manuscript bindings that contain several nautical charts are usually called "nautical atlases" or "portolan atlases". A broader definition of portolan chart includes any manuscript nautical chart or atlas that primarily depicts coastal areas, contains a network of rhumb lines, and has place names written perpendicularly to the coastline. This expanded definition encompasses charts of virtually any sea area and even maps of the entire world, often referred to as nautical planispheres, as long as they satisfy the aforementioned criteria. It also comprises nautical charts that depict latitude scales and have been referred to as "latitude charts" by other authors to distinguish them from typical portolan charts showing the Mediterranean, which some scholars believe were created upon a large body of shipborne bearing and distance data observed through dead reckoning navigation during the Late Middle Ages.

== Specific features of portolan charts ==
=== Rhumb lines ===
Portolan charts are characterized by their rhumbline networks, which emanate out from wind roses located at various points on the map, and represent the sixteen directions (or headings) of the mariner's compass from a given point, which became thirty-two directions from around 1450. The Catalan atlas from 1375 was the first to supplement illustrations of compass roses to centers of rhumbline networks, introducing compass roses to nautical charts, which in later centuries often became highly decorated and ornamented. "All portolan charts have wind roses, though not necessarily complete with the full thirty-two points; the compass rose ... seems to have been a Catalan innovation". The traditionalist branch of historians of cartogrpahy believe that lines in these networks are generated by compass observations to show lines of constant bearing; however, the anticlockwise tilts of the westernmost and easternmost regions on portolan charts do not correspond to magnetic declination from the period of their production, especially during the 15th and 16th centuries, which implies that their geometry was not established using a magnetic compass.

Though often called rhumbs, they are better called "windrose lines" because, as cartographic historian Leo Bagrow states, "…the word [loxodromic or rhumb chart] is wrongly applied to the sea-charts of this period, since a loxodrome gives an accurate course only when the chart is drawn on a suitable projection. Cartometric investigation has revealed that no projection was used in the early charts for which we therefore retain the name portolan". Soon after, cartometric analyses clearly disproved Bagrow's 1964 claim that portolan charts are not based on a map projection. The majority of these analyses linked their geometry to Mercator projection, while the majority of more recent research found agreements with map projections created in classical antiquity.

=== Symbols ===
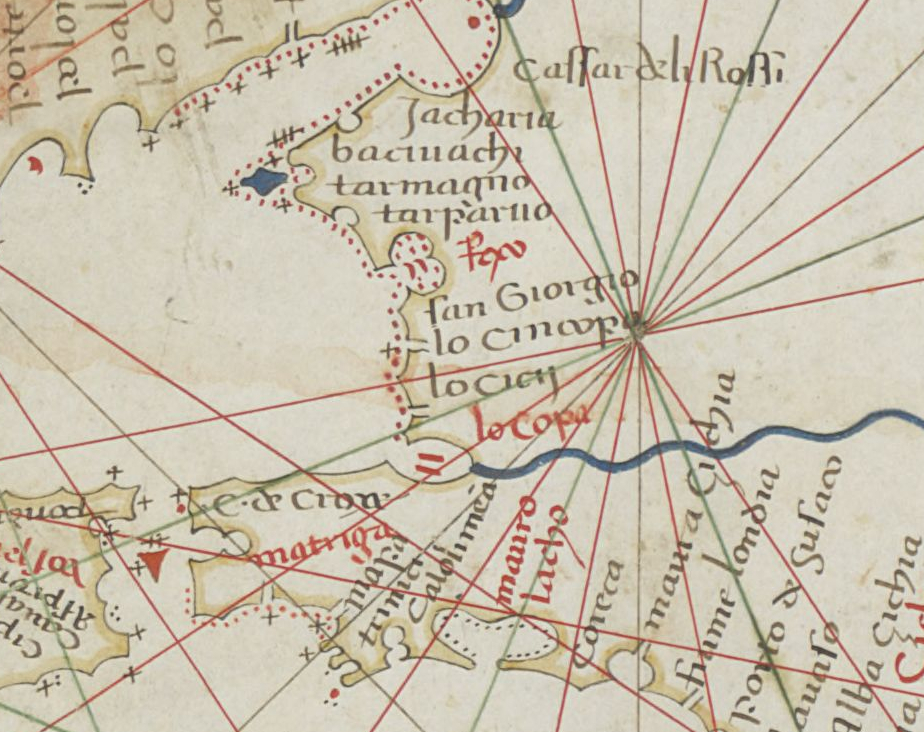
1466 portolan of eastern Azov Sea shores with symbols representing the shores' navigational hazards

Portolan charts use symbols to represent navigational hazards such as reefs, rocks, shoals, and sandbanks. In some early portolan charts, dated to the thirteenth century, black dots denoted rocks, and red dots sand or shoals. The symbol + is the earliest known cartographic symbol on nautical charts, representing submerged or barely visible rocks. This symbol is at times combined with others to represent a group of rocks or sandbanks. The earliest surviving chart, the 1280 Carte Pisana, features symbols for hazards entirely in black, and denotes rocks or rocks awash using only the cross/plus symbol. Within surviving charts the use of two colors was first recorded in the 1313 Vesconte atlas. Charts did not include a key for these symbols, but occasionally they were accompanied by names or comments. These names were often placed at the nearest coastal point to the hazard, but within the coastline.

Arbitrary symbols for navigational hazards such as the plus/cross were not standardized and varied greatly from one mapmaker's work to another, and even within the works of an individual mapmaker. However, despite its many variations and additions throughout time and across different charts, the + symbol represents rocks/rocks awash even in today's nautical charts. Symbols designed instead as abstract representations of the hazard are more consistent across different charts, and many of such symbols are also still in use in nautical charts today. As well as symbols for navigational hazards, some portolan charts also feature pictorial symbols representing features such as anchorage, lighthouses, beacons, and buoys.

== Use ==
The portolan chart combined the exact notations of the text of the periplus or pilot book with the decorative illustrations of a medieval T and O map. In addition, the charts provided realistic depictions of shores. Many historians believe they were meant for practical use by mariners of the period. Portolans failed to take into account the curvature of the Earth; as a result, they were not helpful as navigational tools for crossing the open ocean, and were replaced by later Mercator projection charts. Portolans were most useful in close quarters identification of landmarks. They were, in a sense, "'catalogue[s] of directions to follow between notable points and mnemonics for recalling lists of ports." Portolan charts were also useful for navigation in smaller bodies of water, such as the Mediterranean, Black, or Red Seas. Additionally, in some instances the charts may have been used for travel inland by waterways for trade purposes, specifically in the context of Hungary, as several charts single out that country for special detail, such as showing many cities and riverways in Hungary.

Scholars have also shown a dichotomy between portolan charts used for display purposes and ones used for navigation aboard ships, the latter of which largely do not survive to the modern day. Some of these scholars have argued that many or even most portolan charts were not created for practical navigational uses, but rather as an ornamental item to "show off the owner's worldliness." Examples of evidence that has led scholars to this theory are that some documented chart owners had no evident connection to seafaring, and that records show instances such as a merchant commissioning a chart depicting the parts of the Mediterranean he traveled after returning from his voyage, seemingly as a souvenir and not a guide. The true historical use of portolan charts remains a debate among historians of the subject, and many arguments have been made both for their use as navigational tools and as decorative objects.

== Production ==
Most extant portolan charts from before 1500 are drawn on vellum, which is a high-quality type of parchment, made from calf skin. Single charts were normally rolled whereas those that formed part of atlases were pasted on wood or cardboard supports.

The earliest surviving explanations of how to draw a portolan chart date from the 16th century, so the techniques used by medieval mapmakers can only be inferred. The instruments available in the Middle Ages are believed to have been a ruler, a pair of dividers, a pen, and inks of various colors. Drawing probably started with the windrose lines and then the mapmaker copied the coastal outlines from some earlier chart. Place names, geographic details and decoration were added in the end.

Portolan charts, being entirely handcrafted before 1600, were initially replicated through tracing and therefore often contained errors and inaccuracies. However, over time the invention of printing technologies transformed chart production capabilities. The first printed chart was produced in 1472 using a woodcut technique, and copperplate printing arose shortly thereafter, in 1477. These new printing capabilities allowed charts to be produced in much larger numbers and far more accurately, with copperplate printing especially useful in producing finer lines, smaller letters, and more detailed symbols. After their invention, both printing techniques remained in simultaneous use for the next century, with copperplate printing later becoming the preferred method.

=== Production centers ===
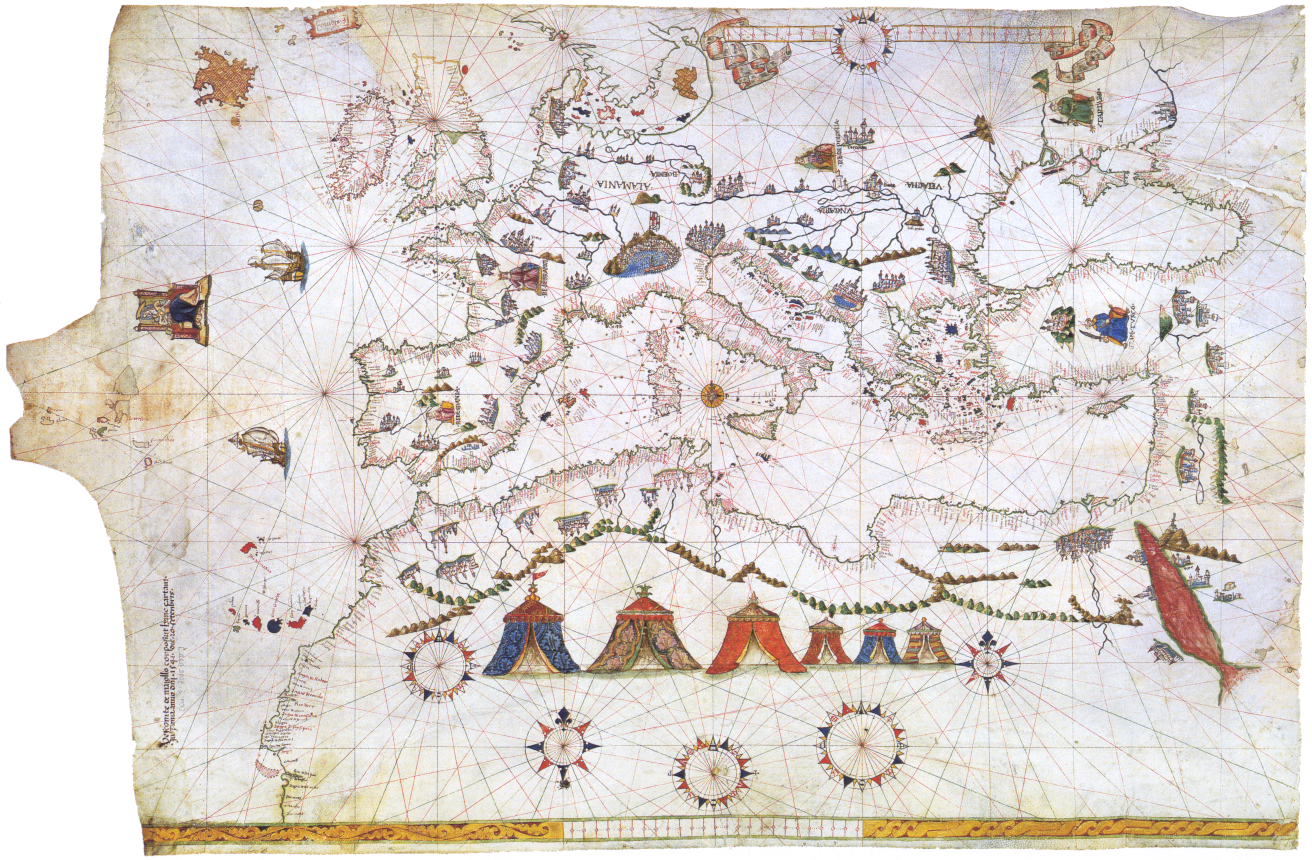
Portolan chart of 1541

Two main families of portolan charts were distinguished by origin, according to 19th-century historians: Italian, developed mainly in Genoa, Venice and Rome; and Spanish, with Palma de Mallorca as a main center of production. Portuguese charts were believed to be derived from the Spanish. Arab portolan charts were not recognized until the second half of the 20th century.

==== Italian ====
The copious number of Italian portolan charts begins in the mid 13th century, with the oldest called Carta Pisana, which is kept in the National Library in Paris. To the next century belong the Carignano Chart, disappeared from the National Archive of Florence where it had been conserved for a long time; cartographic works of the Genoese Pietro Vesconte, the illustrator of the work of Marino Sanudo; the chart of Francesco Pizigano (1373), with stylistic influence from Mallorca; and those of Beccario, Canepa and the brothers Benincasa, natives of Ancona. The fifteenth-century Luxoro Atlas, whose authorship is anonymous, is held at the Biblioteca Civica Berio in Genoa.

==== Catalan ====
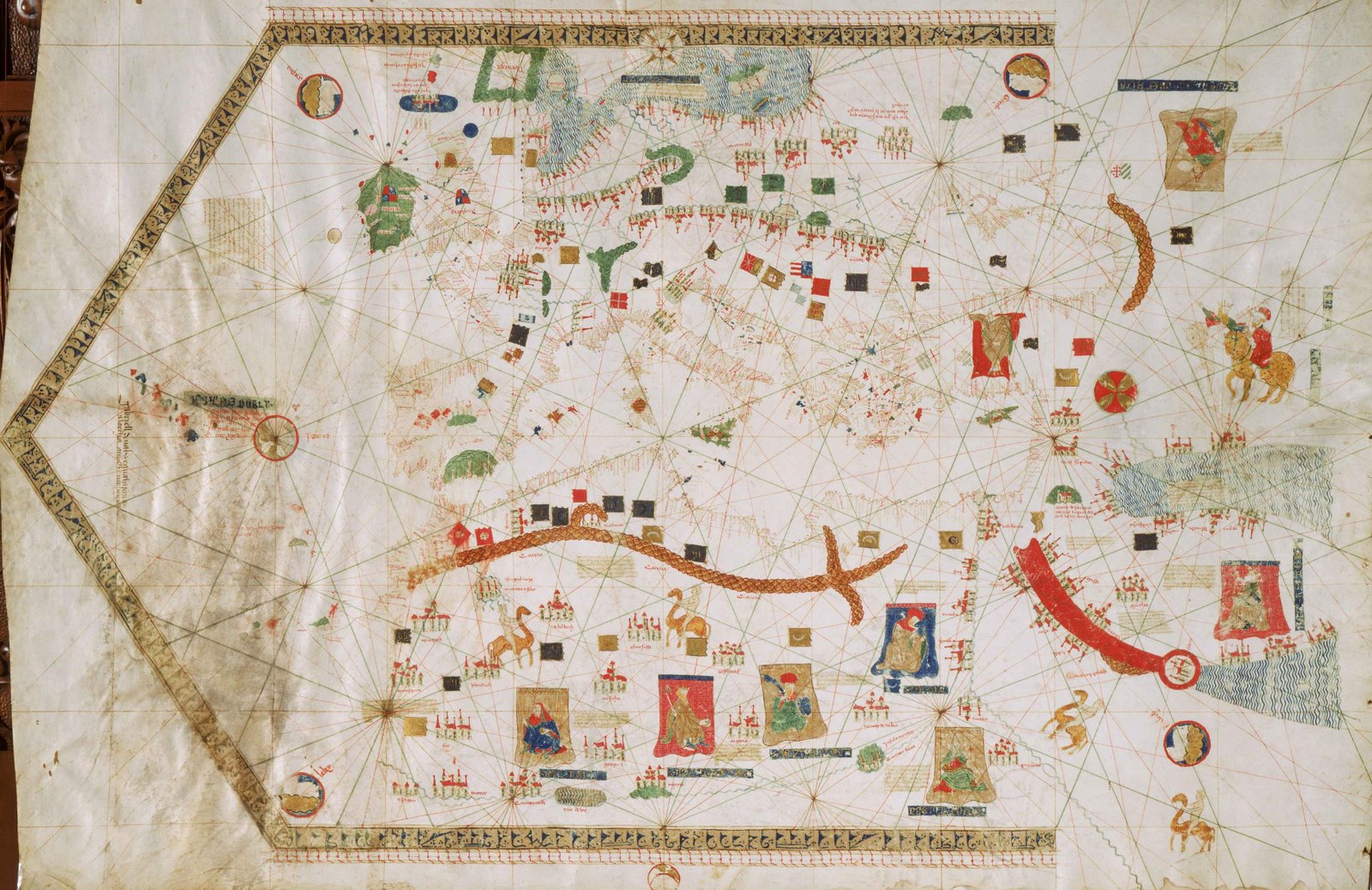
1439 portolan chart by Gabriel de Vallseca (Museu Maritim, Barcelona)

The Spanish introduced a novelty in nautical cartography, with geographical maps having common stylistic representation of certain accidents and locations. The masterpiece of the Majorcan portolan charts is the Catalan Atlas made by Abraham Cresques in 1375, and kept in the Bibliothèque Nationale de France in Paris.

Abraham Cresques was a Majorcan Jew who worked at the service of Pedro IV of Aragon. In his "buxolarum" [=magnetic compass] workshop he was helped by his son Jafuda. The Atlas is a World Map, that is, world map and regions of the Earth with the various peoples who live there. The work was done at the request of Prince John, son of Pedro IV, desirous of a faithful representation of the world from west to east. 12 sheets form the world map on tables, linked to each other by scroll and screen layout. Each table measures 69 by 49 cm. The first four texts are filled with geographical and astronomical tables and calendars. The newest of the Cresques World Map is the representation of Asia, from the Caspian sea to Cathay (China), which takes into account information from Marco Polo, and Jordanus .

In the 14th century, also highlights the work of Guillem Soler, which cultivates both styles, the purely nautical and nautical-geographical. To the 15th century corresponds the famous portolan chart by Gabriel Vallseca, (1439), kept in the Maritime Museum of Barcelona, notable for its delicacy of execution and lively picturesque details, masked by a spot of ink left by Frédéric Chopin and George Sand.

==== Portuguese ====
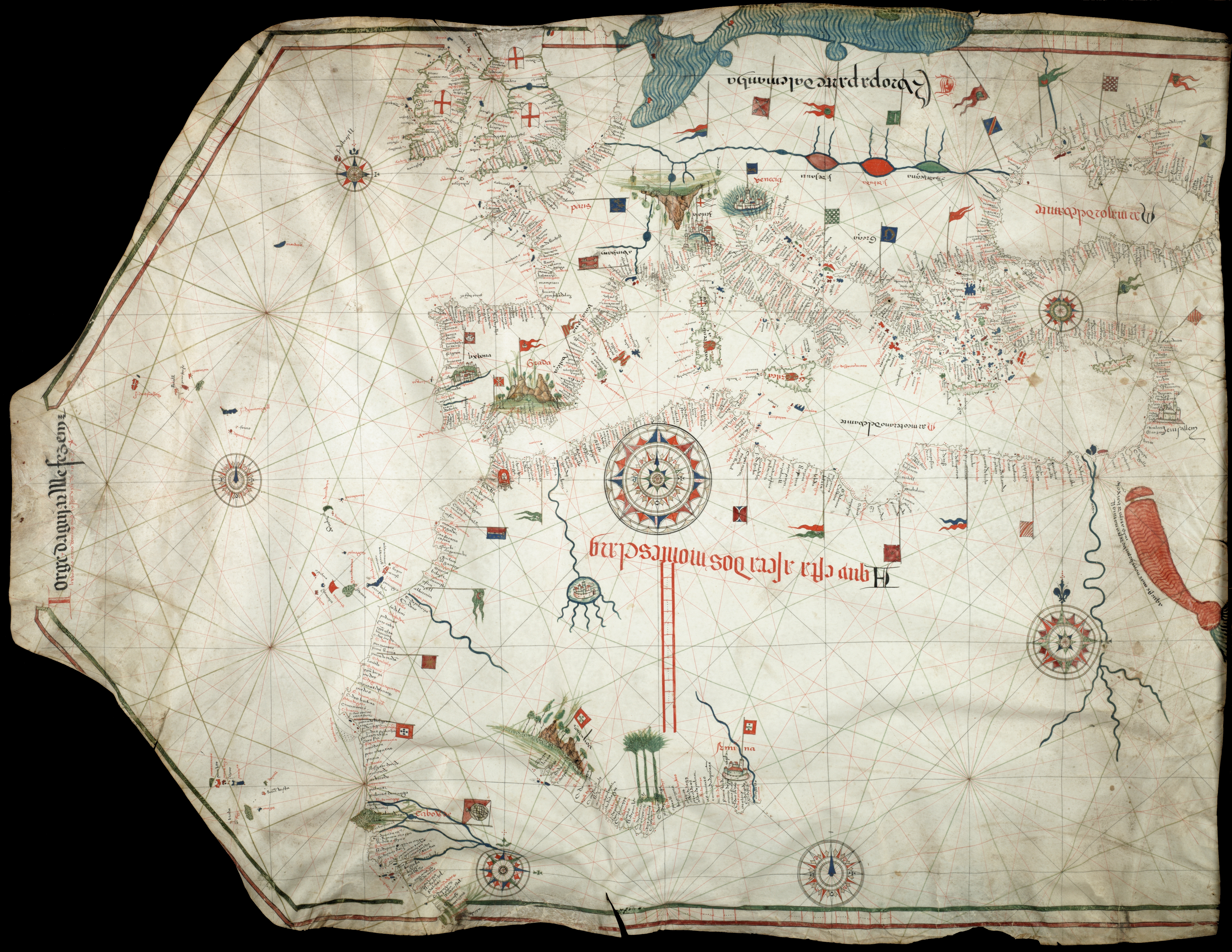
Portolan chart by Jorge de Aguiar (1492), the oldest known signed and dated chart of Portuguese origin (Beinecke Rare Book and Manuscript Library, Yale University, New Haven, USA)

The Portuguese portolan charts come from the Majorcan tradition, and as traditional portolan charts did not fulfill the requirements demanded by the expansion of the geographic horizons attained by Portuguese and Spaniards, they superposed the astronomical lines of the equator and tropics on top of the wind line network, and they continued being elaborated over the 16th and 17th centuries.

==== Arab ====
Three medieval portolan charts written in Arabic are preserved:

- Map of Ahmed ibn Suleiman al-Tangi from 1413 to 1414.
- Map of Ibrahim al-Tabib al-Mursi from 1461
- Map of western Europe, anonymous and undated, preserved in the Ambrosiana Library, dating from the 14th or 15th centuries.

In addition there is a detailed description of a nautical Arab map of the Mediterranean in the Encyclopedia of the Egyptian Ibn Fadl Allah al-'Umari, written between 1330 and 1348. There are also descriptions limited to smaller geographic regions, in a work of Ibn Sa'id al Maghribi (13th century) and even in the work of Al-Idrisi (12th century).

== Theories of origin ==
While the production dates of portolan charts are mainly clear and undisputed, the origin of the spatial data utilised in their creation remains scientifically unresolved, as no less accurate earlier mediaeval nautical charts have been uncovered, nor have late mediaeval cartographers documented precise information on how the data underlying their creations were initially observed. There have been many hypotheses about their origin, including creation by neolithic, Greek, Roman, and Egyptian civilizations, and still others have suggested that given the adornment and ownership records of many of the charts, they may not have even served a practical navigational role. However, there are two principal scholarly hypotheses concerning their origin that have emerged out of the many competing ideas, which can broadly be lumped into two categories: the mediaeval origins hypothesis and the pre-medieval origins hypothesis.

- The medieval origins hypothesis, which mainly stems from a traditional descriptive approach, sees portolan charts as a self-evident fact that a large body of bearing and distance observations, systematically observed by sailboat navigators throughout the Mediterranean, Black Sea, and East Atlantic during their dead reckoning navigations in the late medieval period, was compiled and presented to cartographers, who then transformed it into a coherent graphical representation known as a portolan chart.
- The pre-medieval origins hypothesis, mainly built on the synthesis of cartometric analyses and known historical records, posits that portolan charts exhibit an accuracy that surpasses what could be expected from genuine mediaeval artefacts, indicating they are likely late medieval reproductions of some earlier-made maps or charts. Two comprehensive investigations have been conducted to substantiate this hypothesis; one fundamentally examines the theories related to a mediaeval origin and rejects them without specifically proposing a time or place of origin for the originals, while the other asserts that late medieval copyist-cartographers crafted portolan charts by graphically patching together their reproductions of maps that were originally made in classical antiquity.

=== Geometrical similarity with modern Mercator map ===
The results of the very first cartometric analysis, which was carried out by Hermann Wagner in 1896, initially established that portolan charts are mosaic-images coposed of regional charts or maps that differ in scale and (anticlockwise) tilt and proposed that those pieces were made before the late Middle Ages, while in 1956 Albert Clos-Arceduc observed that the portolan chart image of the Mediterranean is geometrically similar to the modern Mercator map, albeit tilted anticlockwise likely due to the uncorrected magnetic declination from the period of their creation. This geometric similarity, which is essentially anachronistic as it proposes that the conformal cylindrical projection was invented before Gerard Mercator introduced it in 1596, was later computationally confirmed by several computer-aided cartometric analyses, the first of which was carried out in 1966 by Waldo Tobler, using Petrus Roselli’s portolan chart from 1468. In his doctoral thesis from 1987, Scott A. Loomer georeferenced 26 portolan charts to ten different map projections. He concluded that they are mosaic maps that are most geometrically similar to the modern map in Mercator projection, and he suggests that their geometry could have been generated by graphically plotting numerous course bearings.

=== Conflicting ideas of portolan chart origins ===
Roel Nicolai's 2014 doctoral dissertation conducts a cartometric analysis of five portolan charts alongside numerical data from the Compasso de Navegare portolan text, offering an in-depth analysis of the scientific and technological capabilities and constraints of the late medieval period, particularly regarding navigation. He asserts that these are mosaics of sub-charts that are geometrically akin to contemporary Mercator or equidistant cylindrical projections, demonstrates that potrolani texts originated from preexisting portolan charts with distances being scaled-off (contrary to the claims of proponents of the medieval origins), and concludes that their cartographic origins do not lie in mediaeval Europe, yet declines to specify any particular historical period or civilisation as the originators of the original maps. This study also demonstrates that the mariner's compass was introduced in the Mediterranean maritime community only in the mid-14th century, whereas shipborne observations of distances (a method known as the Dutchman’s log) were introduced only in the late 16th century; therefore, they could not have been used to obtain navigational data of sufficient accuracy. Simultaneously, these results suggest that the cartographic capabilities of a civilization that produced the antecedent charts were more advanced than is currently acknowledged, which led certain researchers in the field to react to those ideas, but the criticism was not based on sufficiently strong arguments. In his recently published article, Nicolai demonstrates that the medieval origin hypothesis is valid only if its stages are perceived in reverse, as it stems from reversed causality logical error in which the consequence (portolan chart) is mistaken for the cause, and the actual cause is treated as the result.

To counter the hypothesis of the Mercator projection and pre-medieval origin in general, some scholars have suggested that the Portolan charts were constructed using the so-called plane charting techique. This method would introduce significant planimetric inaccuracies into the chart's geometry due to the accumulation of errors and is incapable of producing such geometry, as it ignores the Earth's surface curvature, and that iterative graphical averaging has been used to improve the chart accuracy. Tony Campbell proposes that portolan charts evolved from the mental maps that Mediterranean pilots had used since ancient times, which had been transmitted orally over generations; however, this notion lacks precise modelling and empirical validation, as it does not clarify how mental navigational data is converted into two-dimensional survey information.

Joaquim Alves Gaspar, who invested a formiddable research effort in proving the medieval origin, argues that portolan charts represent the apex of centuries of collaborative efforts by sailors across the Mediterranean in developing navigational tools. He believes that during the preliminary stage, mediaeval mariners methodically gathered orally transmitted navigational data, and coastal sketches and regional charts of smaller areas, after which came the period of astronomical observations and the development of a now-lost proto-portolan chart orientated to geographic north, which seems to be once appended to the Liber de existencia riveriarum at forma maris nostri mediterranei (Book of the appearance of shores and the shape of our Mediterranean Sea) portolan from the early 13th century, being the earliest known document of such kind. The ultimate phase involved the invention of the magnetic compass, which was allegedly employed methodically to track and record navigational courses, thereby facilitating the making of nautical charts derived from this information and distance records. However, this hypothesis is unsupported by the historical evidence as the creators of portolan charts did not document the data sources employed in their creation. In this context, the centuries of their uninterrupted creation remain enveloped in a deafening silence, with an exception of several of a few notable examples that suggest exactly the opposite: that portolan charts are reproductions of originals from classical antiquity.

=== Classical antiquity origin hypothesis ===
In recent years, Tome Marelić has published research findings in several journal articles providing additional evidence that portolan charts are not genuine late medieval products, and suggesting that they are copies of originals from classical antiquity. The study combines the results of cartometric analyses with historical records and is the first to align with the known historical development of cartography.

The research demonstrates that parts of the coastlines on early anonymous portolan charts (Pisane, Cortona, Avignon, and Lucca charts), which are generally regarded as more primitive, are strikingly similar to those on Pietro Vesconte's charts from the early 14th century, which are thought to be more sophisticated. This suggests that all of them were copied from the same source material. It also demonstrates that the planimetric accuracy of portolan charts and atlases is approximately twice as high at the subsectional (sub-part) level, that over the course of three centuries of their production, their planimetric accuracy either stalled or declined, and that portolan atlases are merely differently segmented portolan charts whose sheet extents do not correspond with their subsectional division. Additionally, between the late 13th and the 16th centuries, the anticlockwise tilts of subesctions of portolan charts and atlases did not change, but the magnitude of magnetic declination gradually decreased over time, making them gradually less and less useful for navigation with the usage of magnetic compass. If portolan charts and atlases had been created using newly acquired navigational data, they would have been geometrically more consistent internally, newer charts would have been more accurate than older ones, and they would have tilted-wise become aligned with magnetic declination values from the time of their creation; however, neither of these is true.

This is the first study to integrate three historical sources claiming that portolan charts were created using maps from classical antiquity as source material. The first one is a written account of a map originally drawn by “the sages of Greece and the ancient geometers” that is geomtrically similar to the Pisane and Cortona portolan charts, written by Persian scholar Qutb al-Din al-Shirazi’s in 1282. The second one is the anonymous Rex Tholomeus portolan chart dated to 1360 that contains an illustration of a human figure holding compasses (dividers), next to whom is a paragraph reading that the “records below [the chart itself when orientated south-up] were made according to the works of Rex Tholomeus who measured the world through astrology [astronomy] in length and width and made world maps and cosmographies”. The third is a passage from De Navigatione (On Navigation) book, written by Benedetto Cotrugli in 1464, ih which he states that “… Ptolemy [Ptholomeo] lived in the age of divine Antonino and wrote a marvellous work. He was a great astronomer and [field] surveyor, who put in order and divided units of measurements and proportions of the seas, skies and lands, surveyed everything with the celestial compass and created a world map according to which we [today] have drawn a navigational chart which teaches us to sail and does not allow us to commit errors. … yet we owe him a lot because we do not wander [across the sea] today. Moreover, what the sailors initially did according to chance and their judgment, we have now arranged according to winds and geographical measures”.

Although the geometry of Ptolemaic maps (late medieval and early modern reconstructions of lost original maps from Ptolemy's Geographia book) is distinctly different from the geometry of portolan charts, this study has detected certain underlying numerical connections between them. It demonstrates that al-Shirazi’s "Greek map" begins near the Canary Islands, which were considered the western boundary of the known world (oikoumene) in classical antiquity, and that the length of a portolan mile of approximately 1.25 km corresponds to an arc-length of two degrees of longitude along the parallel φ=36° (being used in classical antiquity as a true-to-scale parallel for constructing equidistant cylindrical and conic maps of the Mediterranean) according to Claudius Ptolemy's erroneous assessment of the size of the Earth of 180,000 stadia (being roughly 1.4 times smaller than its actual size).

The latest article that emerged from this study subjects the anonymous Carta Riccardiana portolan chart (dated between 1300 and 1325 and supposedly drafted by Pietro Vesconte) to a revised cartometric analysis, detects that its subsections show slightly greater geometric similarity to equidistant cylindrical maps tailored to their mid-latitudes (a concept allegedly established by Marinus of Tyre in the 1st century CE), and proposes qunatitative corroboration of classical antiquity hypothesis. The study employs an empirical model demonstrating that the conventional geometry of portolan charts (which has remained virtually unchanged for centuries) was most likely established by late mediaeval copyist-cartographers due to their general ignorance of map projection mechanics. The model assumes that late mediaeval Italians from the Liguria region acquired regional maps from classical antiquity, originally made in the equidistant cylindrical projection calibrated to their mid-latitudes, and then partially scaled and gradually tilted them using an equidistant conic projection (Ptolemy's first projection) centred at Gibraltar as a reference model to create a graphical mid-solution between them. Moreover, this is the first study that tangibly explains the simultaneous existence of the typical portolan chart portrayal of the Atlantic coasts at a seemingly reduced scale and the northern regions of the Mediterranean at an enlarged scale, and how such a graphically manipulated mosaic of regional representations of the Mediterranean and Black Sea can produce the deceptive impression of an underlying conformal cylindrical (Mercator) projection.

== Evolution ==
The earliest portolan charts focused on the Mediterranean and Black Sea coasts, with only partial and sometimes sketchy depiction of Atlantic coasts up to Scandinavia. In the 15th and 16th centuries, with the beginning of the Age of Discovery, the scope of portolan charts expanded south down to the Gulf of Guinea. Charts also started to be drawn by Portuguese and Spanish mapmakers for the newly explored seas in Africa, America, South Asia and the Pacific. Further, Portuguese cartographers used astronomical data to add latitude lines to the charts. As time progressed, the charts transitioned from being drawn on vellum to being drawn on paper.

== See also ==
- Antillia
- Catalan chart
- Classical compass winds
- Cornaro Atlas
- La Cartografía Mallorquina
- Majorcan cartographic school
- Rule of Marteloio
- Thames school of chartmakers
