= Cayo Arenas =

Sand cays and reef system in the Gulf of Mexico

Cayos Arenas
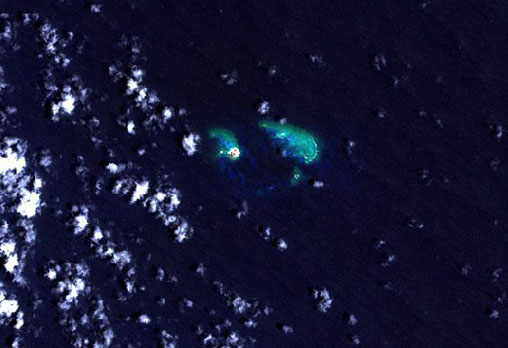
- Satellite image of Cayo Arenas

- Location in Gulf of Mexico

Geography
- Location: Campeche Bank
- Coordinates: 22.10°N 91.39°W
- Adjacent to: Gulf of Mexico; Yucatán Channel
- Total islands: 4
- Major islands: Cayo Arenas (Arenas Island); 3 unnamed cays
- Length: 1 km (0.6 mi)
- Width: 3.30 km (2.051 mi)

Administration
- Mexico
- Federal Entity of Mexico: Yucatán
- Capital city: Mérida

Cayo Arenas is a small reef complex in Campeche Bank in the Gulf of Mexico.

== Geography ==
Cayo Arenas is a reef complex found 169 kilometres (105 mi) from the Yucatán Peninsula. The reef has 3 sections: a northeastern reef wall, southeastern reef wall, and western reef wall. These reefs occupy a horseshoe shape and contain of 4 cays. The largest cay, named Cayo Arenas (or Arenas Key), is located on the western reef wall and has a size of around 300 yards (270 m) by 200 yards (180 m) 2 smaller unnamed cays are found in the NE reef and 1 is found in the SE.

The nearest other islands to the cay are the Arrecifes Triangulos (Triangle Reefs) 98 miles (158 km) to the southeast. The phantom island of Bermeja was said to be near the reef.

== History ==
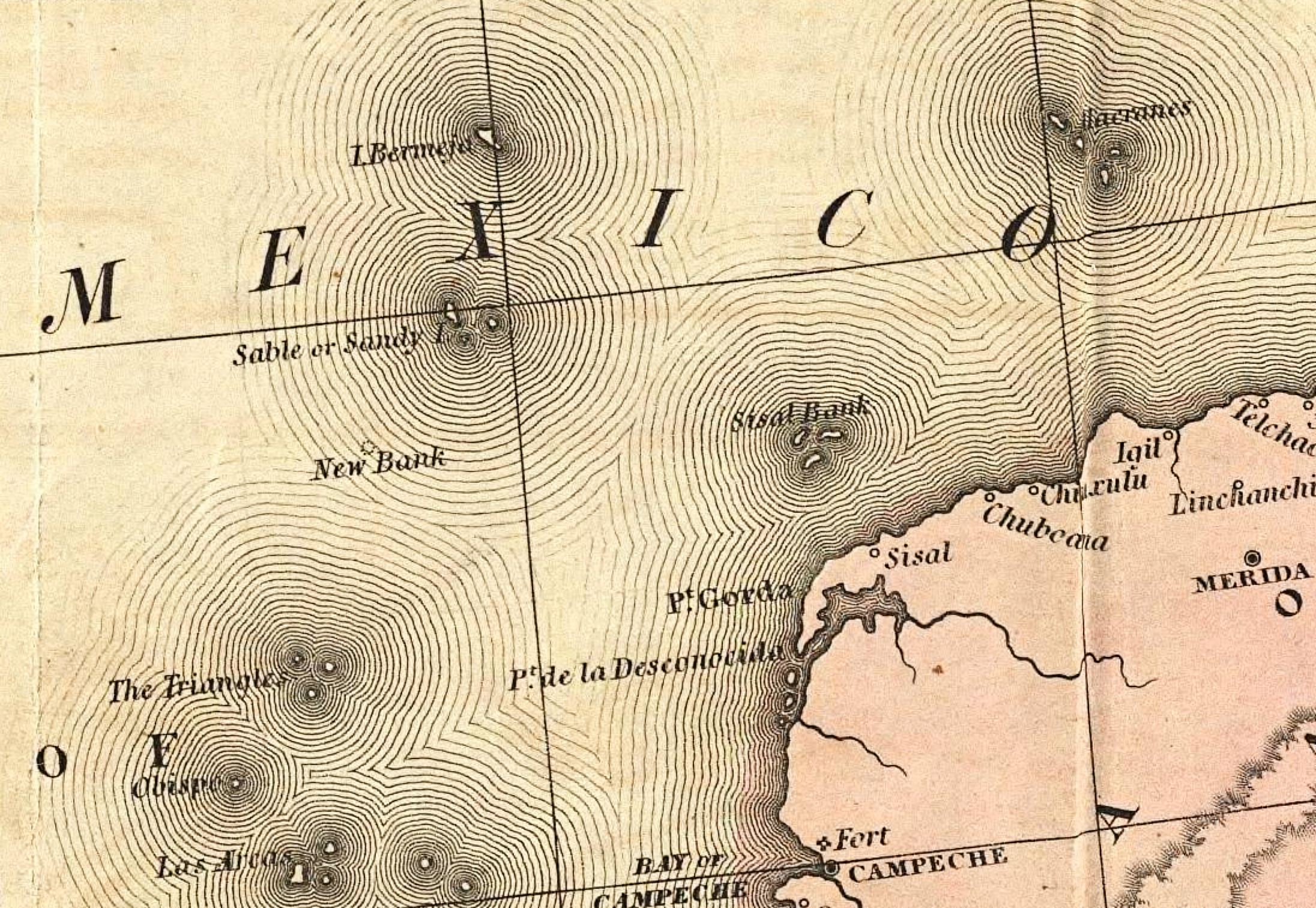
1846 map displaying Cayo Arenas as Sable/Sandy Island

It is not known when Cayo Arenas was discovered and named. An 1846 map displayed the island's name as "Sable" or "Sandy Island"

=== United States Claim ===
On May 24, 1869, Captain James W. Jenette aboard the American schooner Petrel filed a notice of discovery for guano in Cayo Arenas under the Guano Islands Act. He claimed that he made the discovery on January 18, 1867. A second notice of discovery was filed by John G. Wallis on March 20, 1880. After his discovery on January 20 he loaded his schooner, the Eben H. King, with 130 tons of guano, and left 14 laborers on the island. After this notice of discovery, Wallis filed a claim for the islands under the Guano Islands Act. On May 7, 1881, the United States Department of the Treasury fulfilled this claim despite the United States Department of State never recognizing it.:

"That the said lessors for and in consideration of the sum of seven hundred and fifty dollars to them in hand paid by the said lessee at and before the signing and delivery hereof, the receipt whereof is hereby acknowleged, do hereby let unto the said lessee the island of Arenas or Arenas Key, situate on the Campeachy Bank, in the Gulf of Mexico... for the term of twenty years, together with the full, free, and exclusive right, liberty, and privilege of the said lessee, his executors, administrators, and assigns, to go upon the said island and keys to mine, excavate, and carry away therefrom during the first year of said term any amount of guano, at the option of the said lessee."

In October 1881, John Wallis sent a lessee named William Adams to the islands to extract guano. The Mexican authorities then sent the gunboat Libertad to remove Adams from the island and replace the American flag with the Mexican flag. Adams then issued a complaint with the Department of State, however, since they did not recognize the claim Adams and his employees were regarded as trespassers. The Mexican Government then provided evidence of their claim over Cayo Arenas and the island was removed from the Treasury register in 1894. A 1914 map of the area still showed Cayo Arenas and phantom island Bermeja belonging to the US.

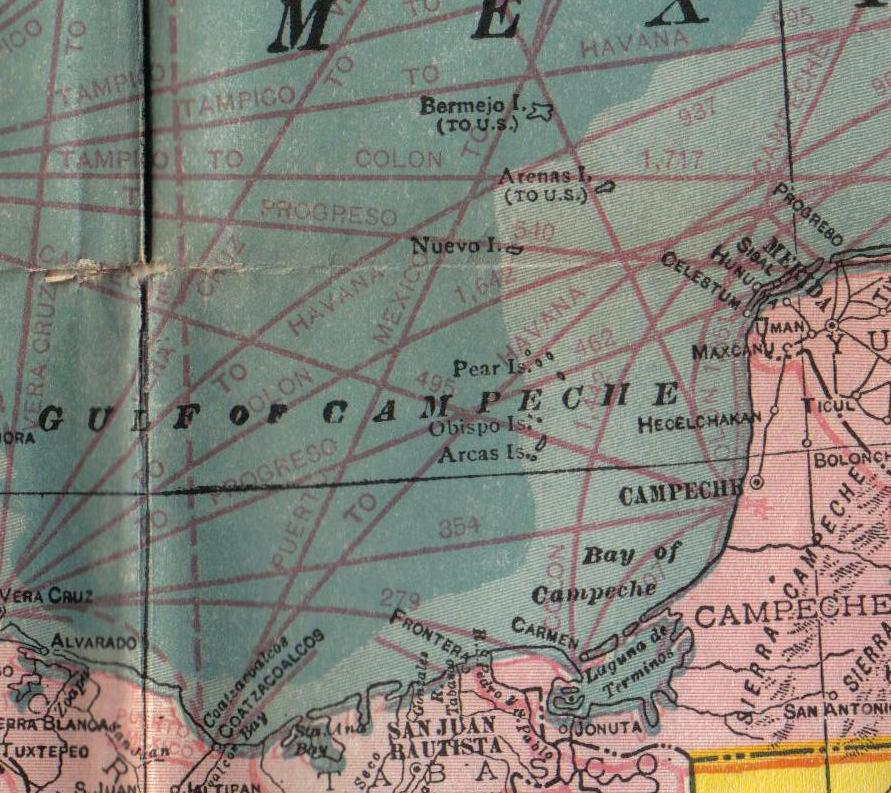
1914 map

== Infrastructure ==
Cayo Arenas has two lighthouses. The first lighthouse was built in 1959 and is a 22-meters tall with a range of 15 miles, this lighthouse has been inactive since 2012. The next lighthouse was built in 2012 and is a red, skeletal, 32-meter-tall (105 ft) tower.

== Ecology ==
Seventeen types of scleractinian corals and one hermatypic coral have been found in the reef. Cayo Arenas is the only island with vegetation. Cayo Arenas gets around 80 inches of seasonal rain a year, and, due to a high evaporation rate the island experiences a dry climate. Multiple species such as Sea Rosemary (Tournefortia gnaphalodes), Sweet Prickly Pear cactus (Puntia dillenii), the vine Ipomoea pescaprae and the purslane (Portulaca oleracea) have all been found on the island. A study from 1952 saw around 400 Blue-faced boobies on the island. A study from 2001 found 258 masked booby nests on the island.
