= Phantom island =

Island recorded on maps but proven nonexistent

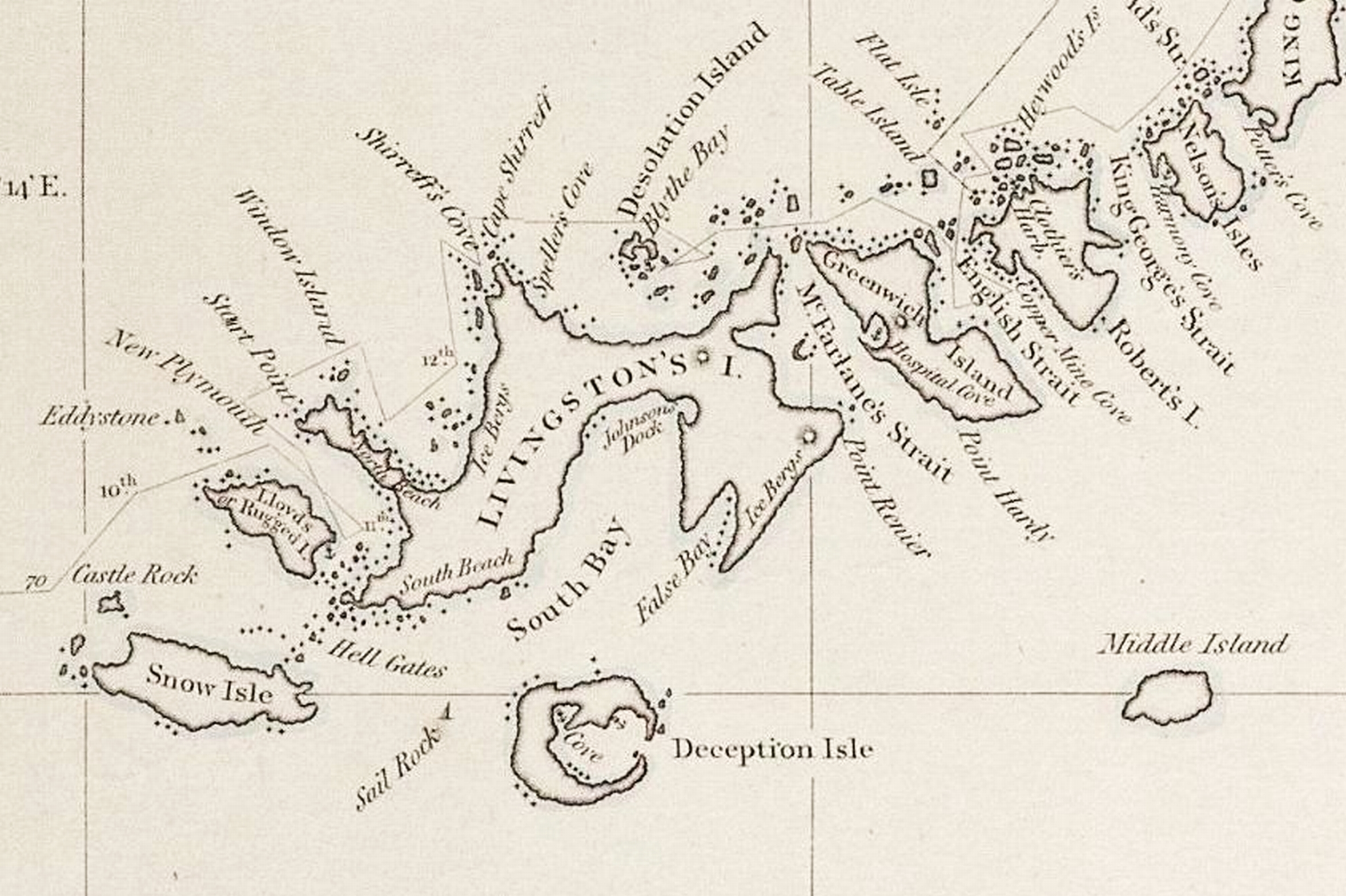
Fragment of George Powell's 1822 chart of the South Shetland Islands showing the phantom Middle Island (bottom right) in Bransfield Strait, Antarctica

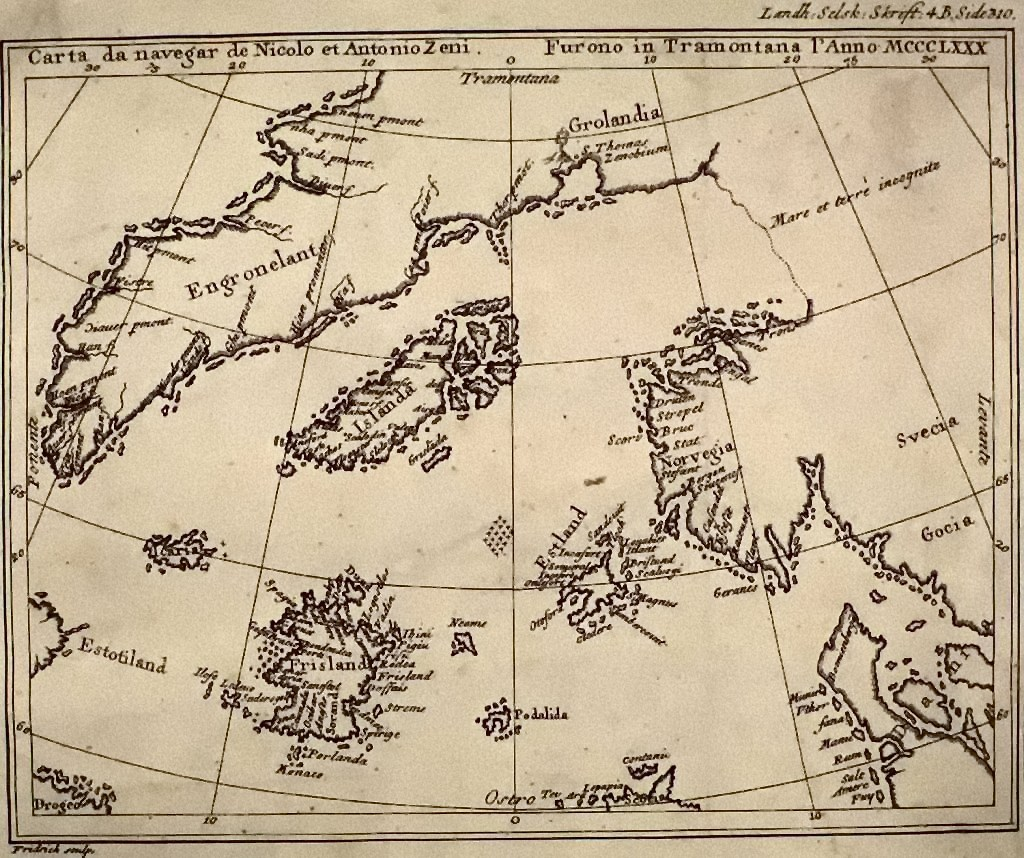
The Zeno map of 1558 showing Frisland – a phantom island in the North Atlantic

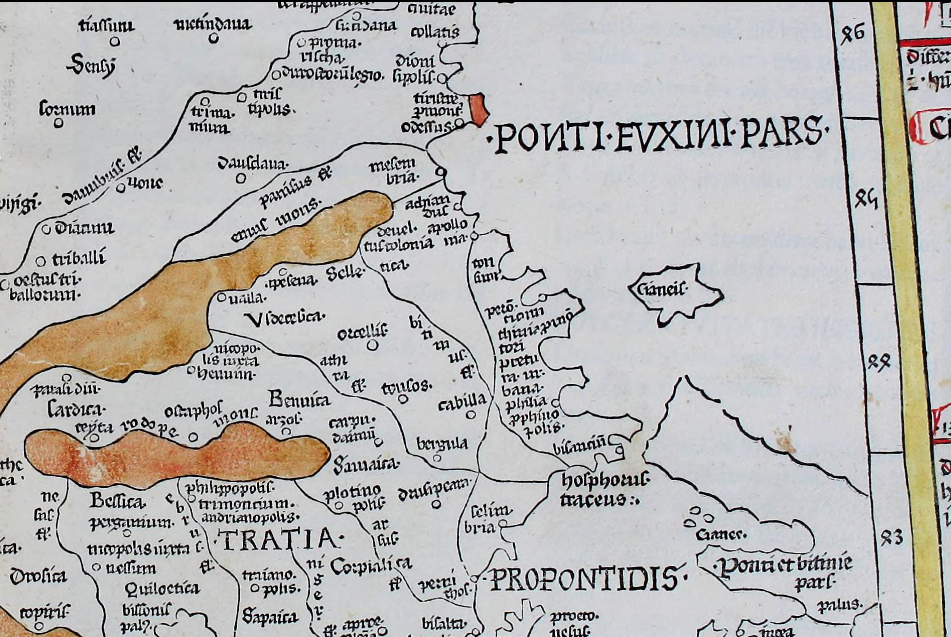
The phantom island of Kianida or Cianeis in the Black Sea on a fragment of the 1467 Nicolaus Germanus edition of Ptolemy's Geography

A phantom island is a purported island which has appeared on maps but was later found to not exist. They usually originate from the reports of early sailors exploring new regions, and are commonly the result of navigational errors, mistaken observations, unverified misinformation, or deliberate fabrication. Some of these islands in high latitudes may also result from iceberg sightings. Some have remained on maps for centuries before being "un-discovered".

Unlike lost lands, which are claimed (or known) to have once existed but to have been swallowed by the sea or otherwise destroyed, a phantom island is one that is claimed to exist contemporaneously, but later found not to have existed in the first place (or found not to be an island, as with the Island of California).

== Examples ==
Various phantom islands were thought to have been discovered at various points, mostly during the 19th century.

Dougherty Island was first spotted in 1841 by Captain Daniel Dougherty of the James Stewart, an Irish whaler, who reported discovering it at 59°20′S 120°20′W, some 2500 miles west of the southern tip of South America. He described it as 5–6 miles long with a high bluff to the northeast and covered in snow. Dougherty's discovery was confirmed by Captain Keates of the Louise in 1860, giving its coordinates as 59°20′S 120°18′W, and by Captain Stannard of the Cingalese in 1886, giving the location as 59°21′S 119°7′W. The island continued to appear on maps as late as 1934.

Emerald Island was first sighted by the British sealing ship Emerald, captained by William Elliot, in December 1821, and the name of the supposed island is derived from the name of this ship. It was presumed to be a small (but high and mountainous) island located at 57°30′S 162°12′E, some 1000 miles SSE of New Zealand.

No trace of the island was found by the 1840 United States Exploring Expedition. Although a captain visiting Port Chalmers reported seeing it sometime before 1890, a search by the Nimrod in 1909 turned up nothing. Nevertheless, it appeared on a map as late as 1987 in a desk calendar book (with atlas) published by American Express.

The Royal Company's Islands were reported by some early explorers to lie southwest of Tasmania. They were first heard of before 1840, but the original report cannot be traced. Many old charts show them at 50°20′S 140°0′E or 52°20′S 143°0′E.

The Nimrod Islands were first reported in 1828 by Captain Eilbeck of the ship Nimrod while sailing from Port Jackson around Cape Horn. Their reported location was east of Emerald Island and west of Dougherty Island, at approximately 56°S 158°W.

Middle Island, once thought to be in the South Shetland Islands, was first sighted along with the rest of the archipelago by British mariner William Smith, on the vessel William, in 1819, although Dutch mariner Dirck Gerritsz in 1599 or Spanish Admiral Gabriel de Castilla in 1603 might have sighted the South Shetlands. Additionally, North or South American sealers might have also visited the archipelago before Smith, though who truly saw them first remains unclear.

Some phantom islands may have been purely mythical, such as the Isle of Demons near Newfoundland, which may have been based on local legends of a haunted island. The far-northern island of Thule was reported to exist by the 4th-century BC Greek explorer Pytheas, but information about its purported location was lost; explorers and geographers since have speculated that it was the Shetland Islands, Iceland, Scandinavia, or possibly nonexistent. The island of Hy-Brasil was sometimes depicted on maps west of Ireland, but all accounts of it have been fanciful.

Some phantom islands arose through the faulty positioning of actual islands, or other geographical errors. Pepys Island was a misidentification of the Falkland Islands. The Baja California Peninsula and the Banks Peninsula in New Zealand each appear as islands on some early maps, but were later discovered to be attached to their mainlands. Isle Phelipeaux, an apparent duplication of Isle Royale in Lake Superior, appeared on explorers' maps for many years, and even served as a landmark for the border between the United States and the territory that would become Canada, before subsequent exploration by surveyors determined that it did not exist.

Sandy Island appeared on maps of the Coral Sea beginning in the late 19th century. Purportedly, it existed between the Chesterfield Islands and Nereus Reef near New Caledonia; however, it was "undiscovered" in the 1970s. Nonetheless, it continued to be included in mapping data sets into the early 21st century, until its non-existence was re-confirmed in 2012.

Other phantom islands are misidentifications of breakers, icebergs, fog banks, pumice rafts from underwater volcanoes, or optical illusions. Observed in the Weddell Sea in 1823 but never again seen, New South Greenland may have been the result of a superior mirage. Some such as Thompson Island or Bermeja may have been actual islands subsequently destroyed by volcanic explosions, earthquakes, submarine landslides, or low-lying lands such as sand banks that are no longer above water. Pactolus Bank, visited by Sir Francis Drake in 1578, may fit into this former sand bank category.

In some cases, cartographers intentionally include invented geographic features in their maps, either for fraudulent purposes or to catch plagiarists.

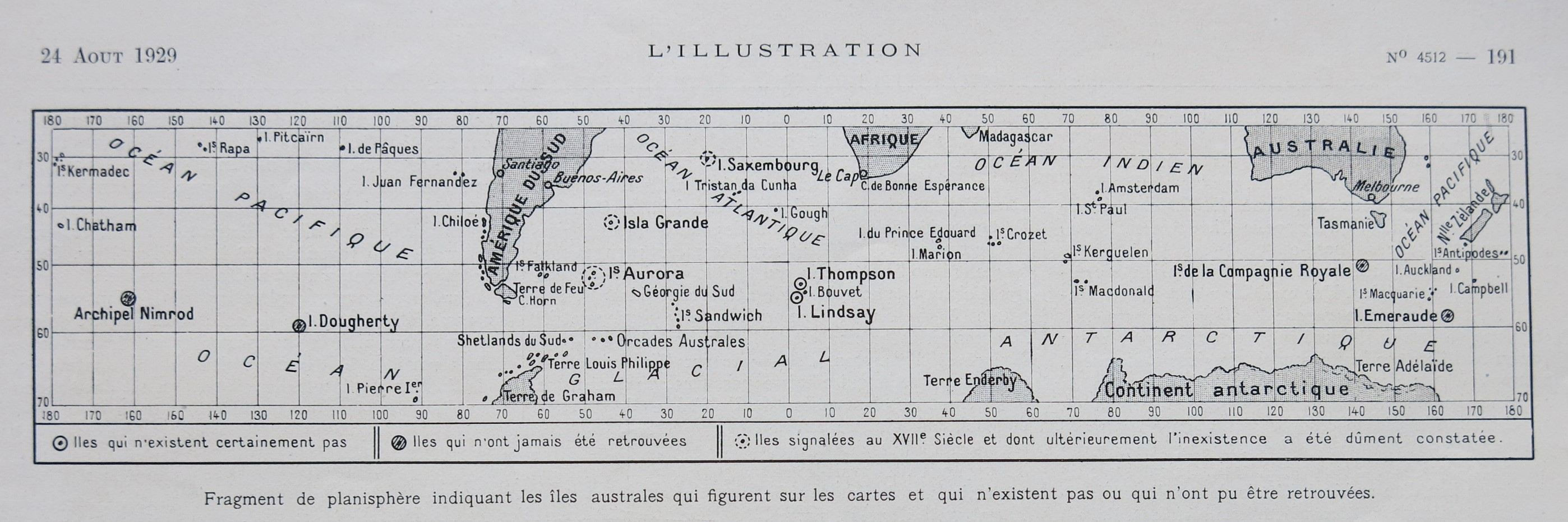
Map of region below Tropic of Capricorn, showing several phantom islands (circled, three phantom types)

== Popular culture ==
The American author Herman Melville mentions the phenomenon in his novel Moby-Dick. After killing and processing its first sperm whale, the sailors of the Pequod release its carcass to sea, and this prompts the narrator to claim that such floating corpses are sometimes the origins of phantom reefs and shoals:

Desecrated as the [whale] body is, a vengeful ghost survives and hovers over it to scare. Espied by some timid man-of-war or blundering discovery-vessel from afar, when the distance obscuring the swarming fowls, nevertheless still shows the white mass floating in the sun, and the white spray heaving high against it; straightaway the whale's unharming corpse, with trembling fingers is set down in the log—shoals, rocks, and breakers hereabouts: beware! And for years afterwards, perhaps, ships shun the place.

== List of phantom islands ==
Name	Date of alleged discovery	Notes
Anaa-ti	Unknown	Location given as 22° 15′ S, 137° 30′ W, in the Tuamotus. Believed to be a mistaken sighting of a nearby island.
Anson Archipelago		
Antillia	c. 14/15th century	The island, like the more popular Atlantis, is a fictional island in the Atlantic originating from an Iberian legend.
Antonio d'Ulloa Island	Unknown	Discovered by the Spanish captain Antonio de Ulloa at 37° 02′ S, 78° 20′ W. Noted as doubtful in 1875.
Arthur Island	Unknown	Location given by Arrowsmith as 3° 30′ S, 176° W. Noted to be needing confirmation of existence and position in 1851; not seen on modern maps.
Atlantis	c. 360 BC	Ancient Greek legend described by Plato, later hypothesized to be real, and depicted on a 1664 map by Athanasius Kircher.
Aurora Islands	1762	Discovered by Spanish merchant ship Aurora, currently thought to be the Shag Rocks.
Bacalao	1472	Gaspar Frutuoso noted its discovery by João Vaz Corte-Real in 1472 in Saudades da Terra.
Bale of Cotton	1767	A rock in the mouth of the Bay of Bengal, located at 5° 22′ N "100 leagues east from Pointe de Galle." A passenger on the boat that saw the rock claimed to have physically gone onto it. Doubtful by 1817 and not seen on modern maps.
Bermeja	1539	Discovered in the early 16th century by Spain, but mysteriously vanished sometime during the 17th century. While no dominant theory holds, it is possible that the island submerged due to tectonic movements, supported by the existence of a seamount at 22°38.76′N 90°51.3′W and the nearby Scorpion Reef.
Bonetta Rocks	Unknown	Location given as 16° 32′ N, 20° 57′ W, between Cape Verde and Mauritania. Could not be found in 1838.
Bradley Land	1909	A mass of land named by Frederick Cook which he claimed to have seen between (84°20′N 102°0′W) and (85°11′N 102°0′W) during a 1909 expedition.
Brasil or Hy-Brasil	1325	Said to lie in the Atlantic Ocean west of Ireland. Irish myths described it as cloaked in mist except for one day every seven years, when it became visible but still could not be reached. Several 16th century maps showing the island of Brasil also showed an island labelled Demar further south-west.
Britomart Island	1822	Discoverer unknown; location given as 19° 52' S, 145° 50' W. Noted to be doubtful in 1851; not seen on modern maps.
Buss Island	1578	Found in the waters near Greenland, in which Martin Frobisher, the leader of the island-finding expedition, probably made a mistake in dead reckoning and mistook optical effects near Greenland for a new island.
Byers's Island		
Island of California	1510	A misconception about the Baja California Peninsula being an island due to an assumption that the Gulf of California was instead a strait separating California from the rest of the Americas.
Candyn		
Cassiterides	430 BC	Ancient source of Phoenician tin. Exact location unknown but thought to have possibly referred to now silt-connected islands within the marshes of Brière.
Clark's Reef	Unknown	Discoverer unknown, location given as 8° 18′ S, 139° 50′ (or 52′) W. Admiral Du Petit Thouars could not find the reef, sounding 200 fathoms.
Cloate's Island	1618	Various locations; sometimes 21° 30′ S, 92° 42′ E, in the Indian Ocean, west of Australia. Probably the headland now known as Point Cloates.
Crockerland	1906	A hoax invented by Arctic explorer Robert E. Peary to gain more financial aid from George Crocker, one of his financial backers.
Davis Land	1687	Supposedly sighted by the pirate Edward Davis in the Pacific along the southern latitude of 27 to 28 degrees, which was on the same latitude as the Spanish-controlled gold mines of Copiago. At the time, it was believed that gold could be found elsewhere along the latitude so several navigators were instructed to seek it out on their voyages. Never found, it was also believed by William Dampier to be the coast of Terra Australis Incognita.
Isle of Demons	1508	Probably a relocated version of the island of Satanazes (see island below).
Denia/Davia	Unknown	Location given as 41° or 42° S, 20° E, in close vicinity of Marzeveen/Maarseveen. Not seen on modern maps.
Diego Alvarez	Unknown	Location given as 39° 10′ S, 11° 15′ W, between Tristan da Cunha and Gough. Not seen on modern maps.
Dougherty Island	1841	Because it is near Antarctica, it is likely that the discoverer, Captain Dougherty, and future explorers who confirmed it, saw fog banks and icebergs conveniently situated in the right place and time.
Dragon Island	1869	Reported by Capt. Andrew of the bark Dragon at 24° 30′ N, 136° 36′ W. Found nonexistent in 1875.
Dunkin's Reef	1824	Discovered by Dunkin; location given as 9° 50′ N, 154° 10′ E. Described as an extensive shoal. Noted as doubtful and possibly a mistaken sighting in 1851; not seen on modern maps.
Elizabeth Island	1578	Described by Francis Drake, who reported harbouring there during his circumnavigation. Not found by subsequent explorers; in 1939 Felix Riesenberg suggested Pactolus Bank as a possible remnant, though recent surveys suggest the Bank may itself be a phantom feature.
Emerald Island	1821	Probably fog banks and icebergs (see Dougherty Island above); the abyssal plain below it was named Emerald Plain, however, in recognition of the nonexistent island.
Emily Rock	1869	Sighted at 25° 38' S, 87° 25' W by the bark Emily. Reportedly measured to be 15' tall and 120' long. 2 other sightings were reported in 1873, now described as being 3/4th mile long and 20 feet at its tallest point, made of sandy volcanic stone. Several vessels passed through the area but did not see it.
Ernest Legouve Reef	1902	A reef supposedly found by the captain of the French ship, Ernest Legouvé, which is near the exact location of the fictional Lincoln Island, the main setting for Jules Verne's book The Mysterious Island, also appearing in In Search of the Castaways.
Estotiland	1558	An island appearing on the Zeno map at the current location of Labrador.
Faith Island	Unknown	Location given as 21° 10′ S, 138° 52′ W, in the Tuamotus. Believed to be a mistaken sighting of a nearby island.
Fata Morgana Land	1907	J.P. Koch, together with Aage Bertelsen, was reported to have first seen Fata Morgana Land (Danish: Fata Morgana Landet) lying in the Arctic Ocean around 80°00´N 10°00´W between NE Greenland and Svalbard. This elusive land was allegedly seen as well by Lauge Koch from the air in 1933.
Filippo Reef	1886	This reef, part of the Line Islands, was first seen by the ship Filippo and was seen again in 1926 when both ships saw breakers in the same area, suggesting a depth of 0.6 to 0.9 metres (2 to 3 feet). Current observations show the reported location to have a depth of 5.3 kilometres (3.3 miles; 2.9 nautical miles), and the nearest shallow seamount is about 4.7 kilometres (2.9 miles; 2.5 nautical miles) deep, disproving the existence of the island.
Fonseca Island	1544	An island sighted east of Barbados.
Frisland	1558	Another island on the Zeno map, possibly a renamed Iceland.
Ganges Island	20th century	A nonexistent island off the coast of Japan to the southwest of the Shatsky Rise.
Isle Grande	1675	Discovered by Antonio de la Roche. Roche only passed the island on its eastern side. Various locations given, all at 45° 15′ S, but otherwise differing at 38° 15′ W (per la Roche), 45° 30′ W, and 35° 30′ W; considered uncertain by 1808. Possibly a mistaken sighting of a projecting headland from South America, as la Roche never saw the other side.
Great Ireland		
Groclant	1569	An island to the west of Greenland, perhaps a misreading of the island's name, or Baffin Island.
Haymet Rocks	1863	Reported to be located South of Rarotonga; two rocks, about 0.25 miles apart, with 7 or 8 feet of water over them; have not been found since.
Humphrey Island	1822	Discoverer unknown; location given as 16° 52' S, 140° 30' W. Krusenstern doubted its existence and was noted as doubtful in 1851; not seen on modern maps.
Hyperborea	Antiquity to 17th century	Hypothetic land of a mythical people living in the far north of the known world, depicted as the mirror continent of Antarctica on the Mercator map.
Ilha de Vera Cruz	1500	A supposed 'island' found by Portuguese explorers, which turned out not to be an island but rather what is currently known as Brazil.
Jacquet Island	Middle Ages	An island just to the east of the Flemish Cap; it was believed to exist into the 19th century, during which cartographers discussed it as a possible midway point for the Transatlantic telegraph cable.
Jave la Grande		
Juan de Lisboa	17th century	Reported on maps as being southeast of Madagascar.
Jupiter Reef	1878	Nonexistent reef in the Line Islands (in fact Line Islands are more than 3,200 kilometres (2,000 miles; 1,700 nautical miles) away), to the south of the also nonexistent Ernest Legouve Reef (see above).
Kantia	1884	Found in 1884 by Johan Otto Polter, who, in four later expeditions through 1909, disproved the island's existence.
Keenan Land	1870s	Large landmass reportedly discovered in the Arctic north of Alaska; numerous searches failed to relocate it.
Kentzell's Island	1856	Reported by Capt. Kentzell of San Francisco at approx. 40° N, 150° 30′ W. The island, 20 miles long and "very low," was said to have a large seal and sea elephant population, and therefore was kept secret by seal hunters. Searches failed to find it while sightings still came in through the 1860s, including one by the Kanrin Maru in 1859. Finally disproven by a survey in 1867.
Kettendyk's Droogte	Unknown	Location given as 33° S, 4° 25′ E, northeast of Tristan da Cunha and west of South Africa. Unsuccessfully searched for, and not seen on modern maps.
Kianida Island or Cianeis Insula	1467	Supposedly known in Antiquity, a large island the size of Thassos but situated off the Black Sea coast of Thrace in the present Bulgaria-Turkey border area. Depicted on the 1467 map Nona Europae Tabula by Nicolaus Germanus based on Claudius Ptolemy's Geography. According to Bulgarian geomorphologist Dinyo Kanev, probably destroyed by sea in the Middle Ages.
Krusenstern Rock	1804	Reported as a breaker at 22° 15' N, 175° 37' W. Capt. R. Suffern of the Craigerne reported that he was at these exact coordinates in 1897 but there was no sign of the rock.
L'Enfants Perdu Islands	1768	Discovered by Bougainville, variously placed at 14° 16′ S, 177° 23′ W or 14° 20′ S, 176° 40′ W. Found doubtful in 1875 after searches found no land in the area. Possibly a mistaken sighting of the Horne Islands.
Jane Island	Unknown	Location given as 16° 10′ N, 173° 15′ W. Could not be found in 1841, and the island being a mistaken sighting of Johnston Atoll was ruled out due to latitude. Not seen on modern maps.
Los Jardines	1528	A pair of phantom islands to the east of the Marshall Islands.
Jesus Island	1567	Reported by Mendaña at 6° 45′ S, 171° 30′ E. Krusenstern doubted its existence and it was noted as doubtful in 1851; not seen on modern maps.
María de Lajara or Maria Laxar	17th century	Usually located northeast from Hawaii, but perhaps originally one of the Bonin Islands.
Maria Theresa Reef (aka Tabor Island or Tabor Reef)	1843	Another nonexistent reef in the Line Islands (in fact Line Islands are more than 3,200 kilometres (2,000 miles; 1,700 nautical miles) away), slightly to the southwest-west of the phantom island, Jupiter Reef. It is a setting for Jules Verne's book In Search of the Castaways.
Maria Rock	Unknown	Location given as 19° 45′ N, 20° 50′ W, off of Mauritania. Could not be found in 1838.
Marzeveen/Maarseveen	Unknown	Location given as 41° or 42° S, 20° E, in close vicinity of Denia/Davia. Not seen on modern maps.
Matsyn Island		
Maury Island	Unknown	Location given as 27° S, 95° 06′ W. Not seen on modern maps, but could not be located on any historical maps either.
Mayda or Isle of Mam	1367	A crescent-shaped island in the North Atlantic that does not appear to exist; however, there is a crescent-shaped group of seamounts 37 metres (120 feet) deep near its described location.
Merrill Island	1832	Reported by Captain Harding Merrill of the Comboy at 16° 38′ S, 141° W. Reportedly inhabited by people resembling Hawaiians. Noted doubtful in 1851; not seen on modern maps.
Islas de Mesa	1555	A Spanish navigator named Juan Gaetano charted an archipelago of islands in the Central Pacific Ocean at approximately 20° N, 138° W that he named the "Islas de Mesa," with islands named La Mesa, La Desgraciada, and Los Monjes. These islands were removed from Spanish charts after James Cook landed in Hawaiʻi in 1778, and it is believed that the "Islas de Mesa" are actually the Hawaiian Islands with their location recorded as being 17 degrees of longitude west of their actual location (an error of about 1,100 miles or 1,800 kilometres) due to Gaetano's inability to accurately find their longitude.
Minnehaha Rock	1879	Sighted by Capt. Beckwith of the Victoria at 25° 50' S, 106° 20' W. No subsequent sightings have been made.
Mokupāpapa	Unknown	Known to the Native Hawaiians as a 'flat island' (translated literally from its name) to the southwest of the island of Niʻihau, past Kaʻula, described variously as 'a five-hour sail' from the latter and 'halfway to Tahiti' and actively being traveled to in James Cook's time, but a search by the voyage's men could not find it.
Nachtegal Rock	1861	Seen by HMS Sphinx at 40° 20′ S, 52° 55′ E. Last seen in charts in 1878.
Nameless Island	Unknown	Discoverer unknown; location given as 2° 50′ S, 170° 18′ E. Noted as doubtful in 1851; not seen on modern maps.
New Badalgo	Unknown	Location given as 18° 15′ N, 143° 40′ W. Not seen on modern maps.
New South Greenland	1823	Unknown odd island near Antarctica, which captain Benjamin Morrell of the ship Wasp saw while traveling north from Antarctica. He thought it to be the Antarctic Peninsula (then called New South Greenland), but his reported location during the voyage, while perfectly copying the expected path for traveling up the peninsula, was over 500 kilometres (310 miles; 270 nautical miles) to the east and 97 kilometres (60 miles; 52 nautical miles) to the north of the actual position of the Antarctic Peninsula, suggesting either a huge miscalculation in location or sightings of icebergs and fog, typical of phantom islands in the Antarctic Circle.
New York and Nexsen Islands	1798	Reported by a Mr. Fanning on the Betsy at 8° 9′ S, 141° 30.5′ W based on location seven hours after sighting. Smoke noted, suggesting inhabitants. Observed from four to six leagues away and not approached. Suspected in 1851 to be a mistaken sighting of two nearby islands; not seen on modern maps.
Nimrod Islands	1828	A group of islands between Emerald Island and Dougherty Island, both of which are nonexistent. Probably a group of icebergs together.
Pactolus Bank	1885	An oceanic bank 120 metres (400 feet) deep off the west coast of Cape Horn, suggested as the remains of Elizabeth Island. A 1956 search of the area turned up no shallow areas in the reported location.
Passion/Paxarus Island	Unknown	Location given as 25° 48′ N, 136° 36′ W or 26° 12′ N, 136° W. No sign of the island could be found in 1873.
Mount Penglai	Antiquity	An island thirty-thousand leagues to the east off the coast of Shandong. Associated with numerous East Asian myths and legends.
Pepys Island	1683	In 1683, Ambrose Cowley reported an unknown island where he thought the Falklands were, but his location was 4 degrees to the north of the Falkland Islands. While it is possible that he made a mistake in seeing a nonexistent island, it is more likely he saw one of the Falkland Islands and made a 4-degree error in his location.
Petermannland	Between 1860 and 1874	North of Franz Josef Land, named after August Heinrich Petermann.
Isle Phelipeaux	1744	A nonexistent island in Lake Superior referenced in the 1783 Treaty of Paris.
Podesta	1879	An island 1,390 kilometres (860 miles; 750 nautical miles) to the west of El Quisco, Chile, that was discovered to be fake in 1935 and promptly removed. Other phantom islands were also found in the vicinity in 1912 and 1858 (see Sarah Ann Island).
Polvaro Island	1505	Usually placed at or near 9° 20′ S, 89° E. Reportedly discovered after a Portuguese ship withdrawing from Malacca to Cape Comorin was lost nearby. Sometimes called Apaluria; sighted into the 18th century. Said to be low, woody, eight to 10 miles long. Absence noted in 1866; allegedly "exploded."
Recreation Island	Unknown	Location given as 15° 35′ S, 150° W, north of Tahiti. Position passed over with no sign of land, removed in 1864.
Reed/Redfield Rocks	1850	First sighting reported by Capt. Reed of the brig Emma at 37° 24′ N, 137° 22′ W in the Shipping Gazette. More sightings were made in varying locations in 1851, 1856, and 1866. They were said to be two rocks, 600–900 feet long and 50–40 feet across, under 3–5 fathoms of water and breakers in rough weather. Four surveys from 1871 to 1875 could not find them, but another sighting in 1889 said they were now four feet above the water. Another survey in 1902 disproved their existence, but were still marked on maps as doubtful.
Rivadeneyra Shoal	1842	A shoal in the eastern Pacific Ocean.
Rocabarraigh		
Ilha dos Romeiros	Unknown	Location given as 28° 40′ S, 74° E, between Madagascar and Australia. Removed from charts by 1856 or earlier.
Roque Piz	1649	First seen in a chart by João Teixeora, located at 6° S, 60° E. Seen on maps as late as 1865, described as being three flat islands. Likely a mistaken sighting of the Seychelles or Chagos.
Royal Company's Islands	Before 1840	A fictional island widely believed during the 19th century to be to the southwest of Tasmania. While not found by numerous expeditions in 1840, 1889, 1902, 1909, and 1912, the island was not officially removed from nautical charts until 1904.
Royllo	1424	A small island to the west of the mythical Antillia (see Antillia above).
Rupes Nigra	14th century	A magnetic, black island at the exact Magnetic North Pole, invented as an explanation for why all compasses point north.
Saint Brendan's Island	512	Claimed to have been first visited in 512 by the monk St. Brendan and 14 others, along with later reports up to 1772.
St. Elmo	1606	Reported by Quiros, location 21° 20' S, 143° 50' W. Said to be low, surrounded by coral reefs, with a 30 Spanish leagues circumference. Noted as doubtful in 1851; not seen on modern maps.
St. Matthew Island	1516	An island near the coast of Africa, roughly 1,000 kilometres (620 miles; 540 nautical miles) east-northeast of Ascension Island and possibly confused with the same latitude Annobón Island.
Sandy Island	1774	Another phantom, small island to the west of New Caledonia that was recorded on many maps until 2012, when a surveying ship passed by and disproved its existence. The current leading explanation is that the island was a raft of buoyant pumice from a recent nearby seamount eruption.
Sannikov Land	1809	An island near the De Long Islands, north of Russia, that probably did exist but was destroyed due to coastal erosion.
Sarah Ann Island	1858	A phantom island near Easter Island, similar to Podesta island. See Operational Navigation Chart of the United States Department of Defense.
Satanazes	1424	This island was originally noted on maps in 1424, originating from popular legend of devils and demons attacking ships that went into the area, but the island was subsequently removed because it obviously did not exist. The island, often drawn to the north of the mythical Antillia, was purportedly full of evil demons but was sometimes called Salvaga to avoid using the profanity "devil".
Saxemberg Island	1670	An odd island midway between South America and Africa that numerous captains reported seeing in 1804, 1809, and 1816. While most had conflicting reports, all of them found the island in the same location; however, none of them actually made landfall. It is possible the island was volcanic and later erupted and destroyed itself. It is also possible that they were looking at Tristan de Cunha island.
Schjetman Reef	1868	To the west of the Hawaiian Islands, Schjetman Reef was originally found in 1868 to be an island 2.8 kilometres (1.7 miles; 1.5 nautical miles) long and 0.93 kilometres (0.58 miles; 0.5 nautical miles) wide. Later searches in 1880, 1923, and 1924 could not find the island.
Sefton Reef	1808	Approx. 83°W, 37°S (southwest of Robinson Crusoe Island), noted as "position doubtful" in Operational Navigation Chart of the United States Department of Defense.
Terra Nova Islands	1961	Thought to lie off Oates Coast, East Antarctica.
Thompson Island	1825	An island in the south Atlantic Ocean discovered by the whaling ship captain George Norris; it has not been seen since 1893.
Thule	325 BC	A mythical island in the far north, possibly at or above the Arctic Circle, mentioned in many works from the Roman and Medieval period. Sources in antiquity placed Thule several days travel north of Great Britain visible from Orkney; or north of Scythia. More modern scholars have suggested Thule may have been Ireland; the Estonian island of Saaremaa; or the Norwegian island of Smøla.
Tiburones	Unknown	Captain D'Urville asked the residents of Uapoa about this island in August 1838. They claimed it existed, reporting it had high land, one sandy beach which could be approached in good weather, and a single male inhabitant (the others having fled). Location given as 11° S, 143° W; noted doubtful in 1851 and not seen on modern maps.
Torca Island	1693	A mythical island near Ambon in Indonesia purportedly destroyed by a volcanic eruption.
Transit Reef	18th century	A possible reef in Southern Palau. While this reef probably exists, some maps do not list it as an actual location, and, although the reef doesn't have any land, the native name of the island, Pieraurou, means 'Sandy Navigation Point', implying a sandy island or sand bar.
Truls Island	1962	Reported by the tanker Truls at 56° S, 23° 15′ E. Marked on USHO Chart 5188B in October 1969 as "ED" (existence doubtful).
Tuanaki	1842	A vanished group of islets in the Cook Islands at which a sailor allegedly spent 6 days, but a ship traveling in the waters two years later found no island.
Turnbull Island	Unknown	Location given as 19° 52′ S, 143° 32′ W. Noted as doubtful in 1864 and removed from charts after 1875.
Two Brothers Reef	1823	Reportedly struck by a whaling ship in 1823, location listed as 24° 14' N, 168° 28′ W. Existence doubtful by 1912 due to lack of sightings; not seen on modern maps.
Wachusett Reef	1899	A nonexistent reef in the Line Islands – in fact Line Islands are more than 3,200 kilometres (2,000 miles; 1,700 nautical miles) away – along with Ernest Legouve Reef, Jupiter Reef, and Maria Theresa Reef. This reef, the largest of the three, was thought to be 9–10.5 metres (30–35 feet) deep. None of these reefs are currently believed to have actually existed.
Walker Island	1810s	A claimed "island" southeast of Hawaii reportedly discovered by a captain named Walker sometime between 1812 and 1814. It is shown slightly east of the phantom island Sarah Ann Island on some maps. Another theory suggests that it may have been confused with Washington Island.
Willoughby's Land		
Yosemite Rock	1903	Approx. 83°W, 32°S (northwest of Robinson Crusoe Island), noted as "Existence doubtful" in Operational Navigation Chart of the United States Department of Defense.
(unnamed bank)	Before 1901	Shown on historical charts at 30° 55' N, 177° 30' E and 42 fathoms deep. Soundings of this area in 1901 and 1902 failed to locate the bottom at 100 fathoms, and it is not seen on modern maps.
(unnamed rock)	1869	Sighted by the steamer Great Pacific at 25° 40' S, 85° 0' W. The Sumbawa passed through the area in 1904 but did not see it.
(unnamed breakers)	1901	Reported at 21° 55' N, 176° 05' W. There is no indication of these breakers on modern maps.

== See also ==
- Former island
- Fictitious entry
- List of fictional islands
- List of lost lands
- Lost city
- Null Island
- Mythical place
- Phantom settlement
- Terra incognita
- Vigia
