= Podesta (island) =

Phantom island reported far off the coast of Chile

Podesta is a phantom island reported at 32°14′S 89°08′W by the Italian Captain Pinocchio of the vessel Barone Podestà (Hereward Carrington, Carrington Collection, page 21) in 1879 claiming it to be just over a kilometre (1000 yards) in circumference located 1390 km (750 n. mi.) due west of El Quisco, Chile. It was originally located 900 miles west of Chile's coast. The island was charted until 1935, when it was removed from charts (marked "Existence Doubtful" by Defense Mapping Agency's 1975 Operation Navigational Chart R-22). The island has not been found since.

An island near Easter Island was sighted in 1912 but was likewise never seen again. Sarah Ann Island northwest of Easter Island was another island also removed from naval charts when a search in 1932 failed to find it.

Currently the micronation of the Republic of Rino Island claims "sovereignty" over the Podestá Island.

== Sources ==
- Stommel, Henry (1984). Lost Islands: The Story of Islands That Have Vanished from Nautical Charts. Vancouver: University of British Columbia Press, pp 103–104. ISBN 0-7748-0210-3.
- Carrington, Hereward (1947). Carrington Collection. E. Haldeman-Julius.
