= Ambrose Cowley =

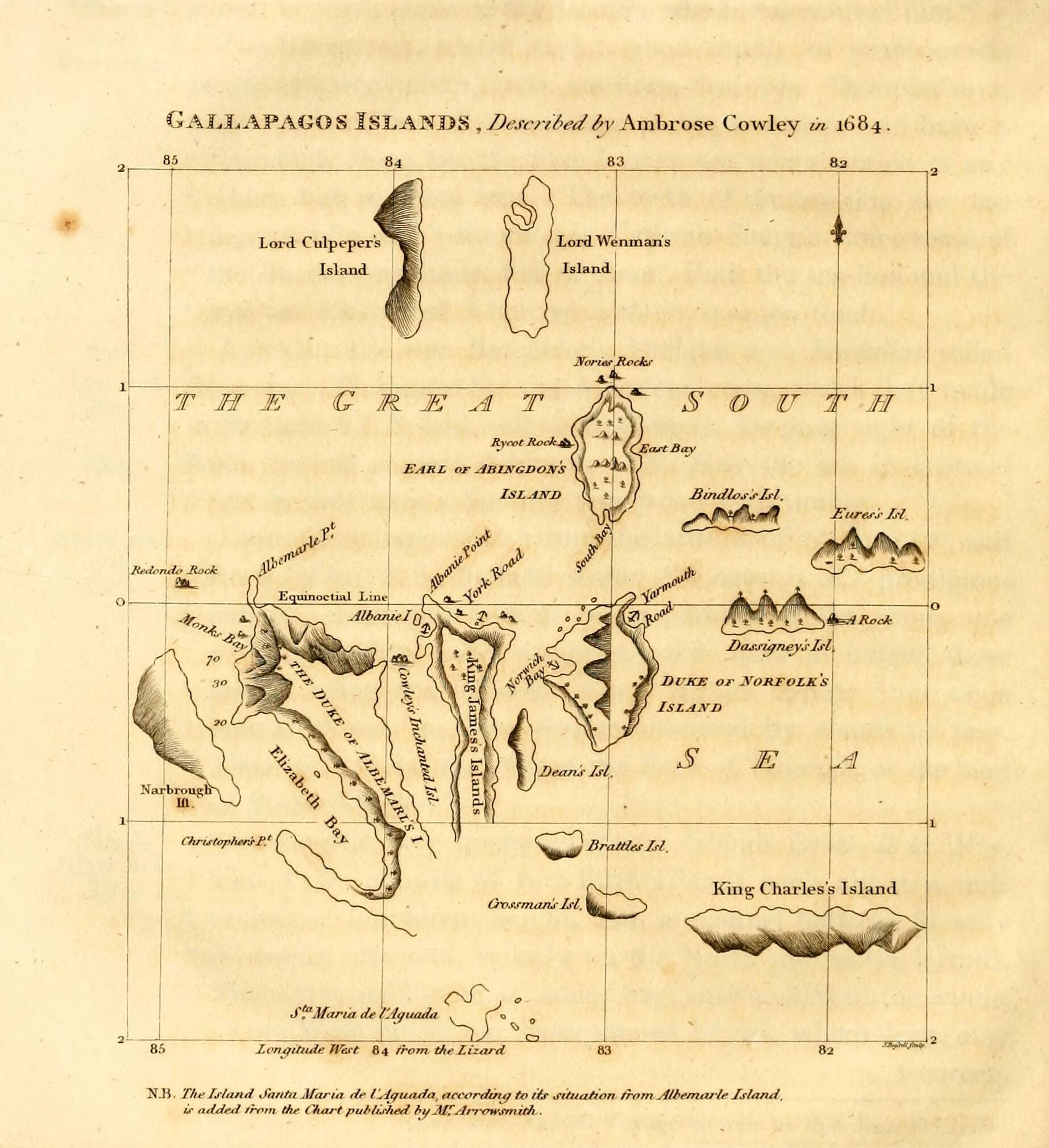
Map of the Galapagos Islands as described by Cowley in 1684.

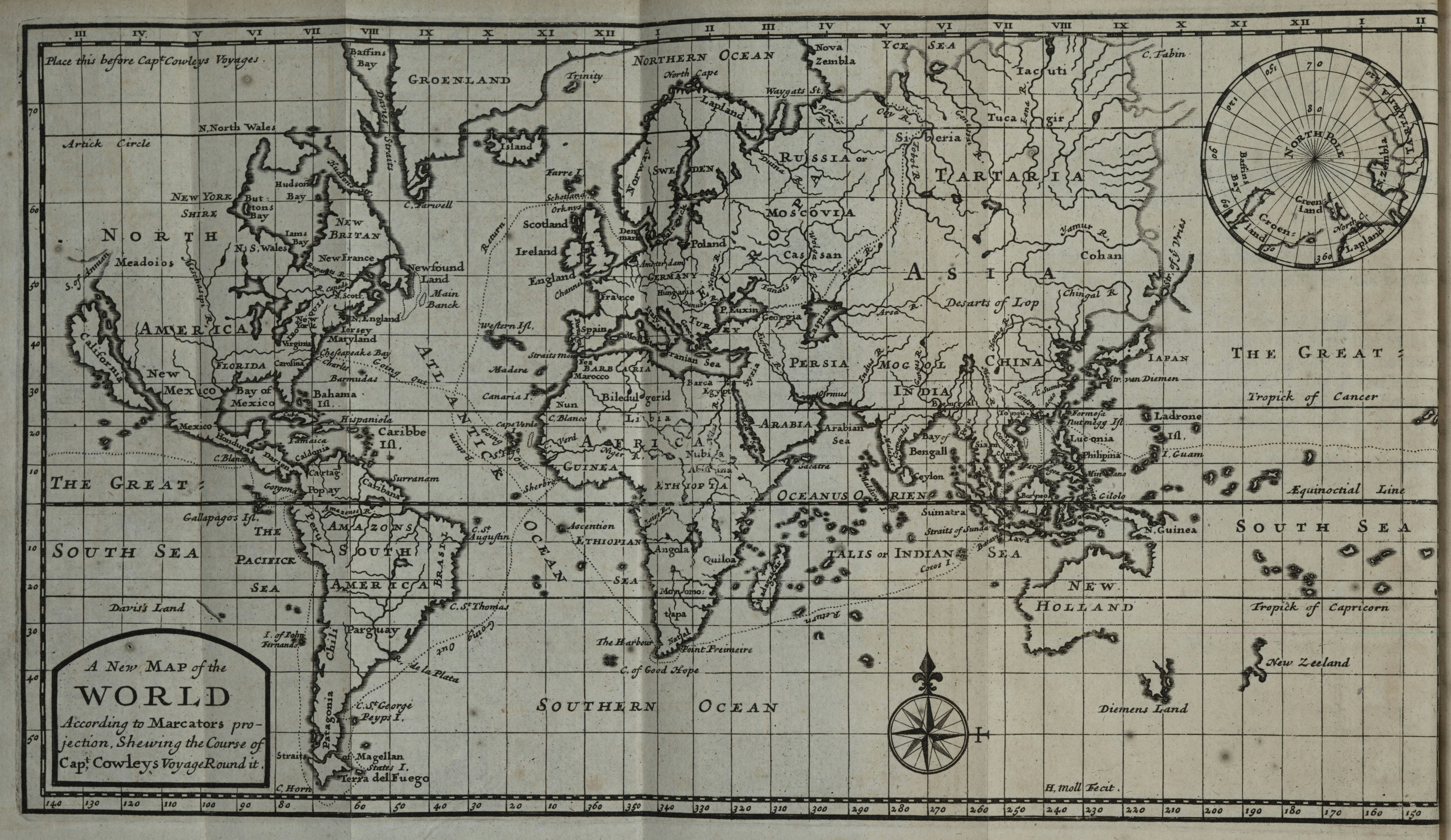
The map of Cowley's circumnavigation of the world in the 1699 first edition of William Hack's Collection of Original Voyages

William Ambrosia Cowley, also known as Ambrose Cowley and Captain Cowley, was a 17th-century English buccaneer who surveyed the Galápagos Islands during his 1683–1686 circumnavigation of the world while serving under several captains such as John Eaton, John Cook, and later Edward Davis. Cowley drafted the first chart of the islands in 1684, first published with the account of his voyage in 1699. In his diary he reported the discovery of the phantom Pepys Island, allegedly situated north of the Falkland Islands, prompting a number of mariners to look in vain for the nonexistent rock.
