= Ernest Legouve =

Ernest Legouve may refer to:

- Ernest Legouvé (1807–1903), French dramatist
- Ernest Legouve Reef, in the South Pacific Ocean, reported in 1902 by the French ship Ernest‑Legouvé
- Ernest Legouve (barque), sunk by SM UB-32 in 1917
