= Jupiter Reef =

Phantom reef in the South Pacific

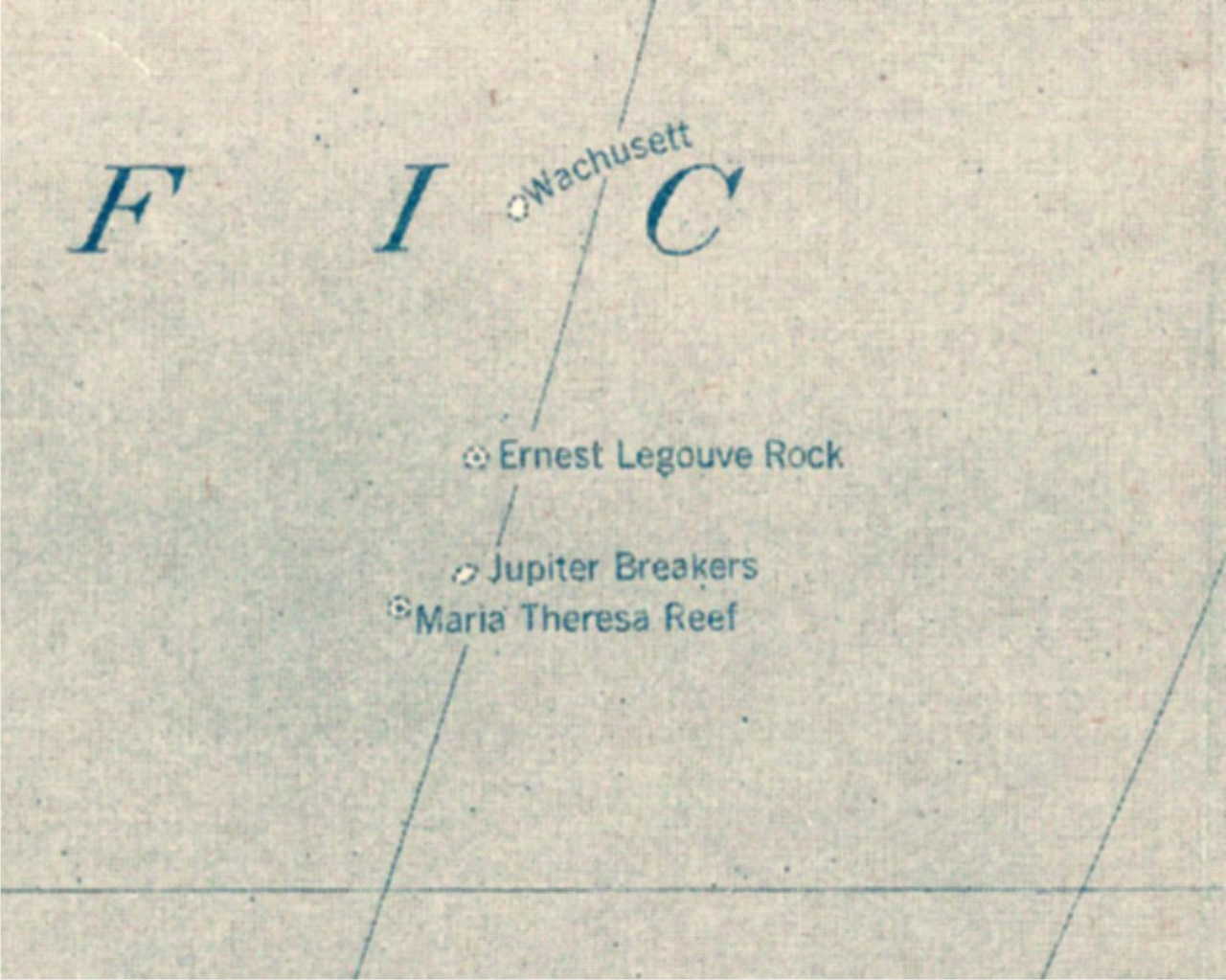
- Jupiter Breakers on 1921 Pacific map

In-universe information
- Type: Phantom island

Alleged location of Jupiter Reef in the Pacific Ocean

Jupiter Reef or Jupiter Breakers is a supposed reef in the South Pacific (south of French Tuamotu islands and east of New Zealand), between other supposed reefs, Maria Theresa Reef to the south and Ernest Legouve Reef to the north; it appears to be a phantom reef.

Mr. Kinge, commanding the German barque Jupiter on a voyage between Newcastle, New South Wales and Tahiti, reported having passed breakers during the night of December 3, 1878, in 36°37′S 150°15′W. The breakers were observed in two places, each of which had a diameter of about 30 yards, and appeared to be a quarter of a mile apart. No further intelligence has been obtained regarding this shoal.

Other nearby historically reported reefs which appear not to exist include Maria Theresa Reef, Ernest Legouve Reef, and Wachusett Reef.

This article incorporates text from Pacific Islands, v. 3, a publication from 1900, now in the public domain in the United States.
