= Terra Nova Islands =

The Terra Nova Islands (68.89°S 157.95°E) are a pair of small phantom islands. They were thought to lie off Oates Coast, East Antarctica, about 14 nautical miles (26 km) north of Williamson Head in the Somov Sea.

== History ==
The Terra Nova islands were "sighted" from the Magga Dan on 8 March 1961, by the Australian National Antarctic Research Expeditions (ANARE) under Phillip Law. They were named by the Antarctic Names Committee of Australia (ANCA) after the Terra Nova, which was the lead expedition ship of the 1910–13 British Antarctic Expedition, and from which Royal Navy Lieutenant H.L.L. Pennell discovered and charted coastal points in the vicinity.

In 1989, the German GANOVEX V expedition planned to visit the islands and map them. But when the expedition's geologists arrived at the listed coordinates via helicopter, no sign of the islands could be found in the area. Depth measurements via echo sounding by the research ship Polar Queen showed water depths between 170 and 355 meters at the islands' purported location. Subsequent visits to the area by the GANOVEX VII and GANOVEX VIII expeditions confirmed the nonexistence of the islands.

== Terra Nova Canyon ==
Terra Nova Canyon (69°0′S 159°0′E) is an undersea canyon named in association with the Terra Nova Islands. Name approved 6/88 (ACUF 228).

== See also ==
- List of antarctic and sub-antarctic islands
