= Jacquet Island =

Jacquet Island was a phantom island charted at approximately 47°N 43°W in the North Atlantic, just to the east of the Flemish Cap. Belief in its existence continued into the 19th century, when it was discussed by cartographers as a possible midway point for the transatlantic telegraph cable. John Scott of the Seaflower reported seeing it in 1836.
