= Schjetman Reef =

Phantom island in the North Pacific

- Interactive map of Schjetman Reef

Geography
- Location: North Pacific Ocean
- Coordinates: 16°8′N 178°58′W
- Length: 2.8 km (1.74 mi)
- Width: 0.9 km (0.56 mi)

Administration
- None (phantom island)

Schjetman Reef is a supposed phantom island in the North Pacific west of Hawaii, reported discovered by the Norwegian captain Ole Andreas Schjetnan in 1868. He reported its coordinates to be 16°8′N 178°58′W. The island was reported to be 1.5 nautical miles (2.8 km) long (north-to-south) and 0.5 nautical miles (0.9 km) wide (east-to-west). Due to a similar latitude (less than half a degree) to Johnston Atoll, it is possible that it was simply a misreading of longitude. Regardless, there is no evidence of any islands in the remote vicinity of Schjetnan's reported location, with the closest prominence of any size being a small, unnamed seamount roughly 100 miles to the east.

Since Schjetnan's discovery, various expeditions have set out to attempt to find the island. The USS Alert in 1880, the USS Milwaukee in 1923, and the USS Whippoorwill and Tanager in 1924 all searched for the island without finding it. A sighting was reported in 1990, however, by a sailor from Hawaii.

The two Norwegians Bård Sæther and Arild Solheim undertook an expedition in the S/Y Havaiki in January 2006 to find the island.

The reef continued to appear on maps as late as 1934.

== See also ==
- 1921 National Geographic map showing Schjetman Reef between Wake Island and Johnston Island
- 1932 German map showing Schjetman Reef in same location
