= Isle Phelipeaux =

Phantom island in Lake Superior

Coordinates: 47.74°N 88.33°W

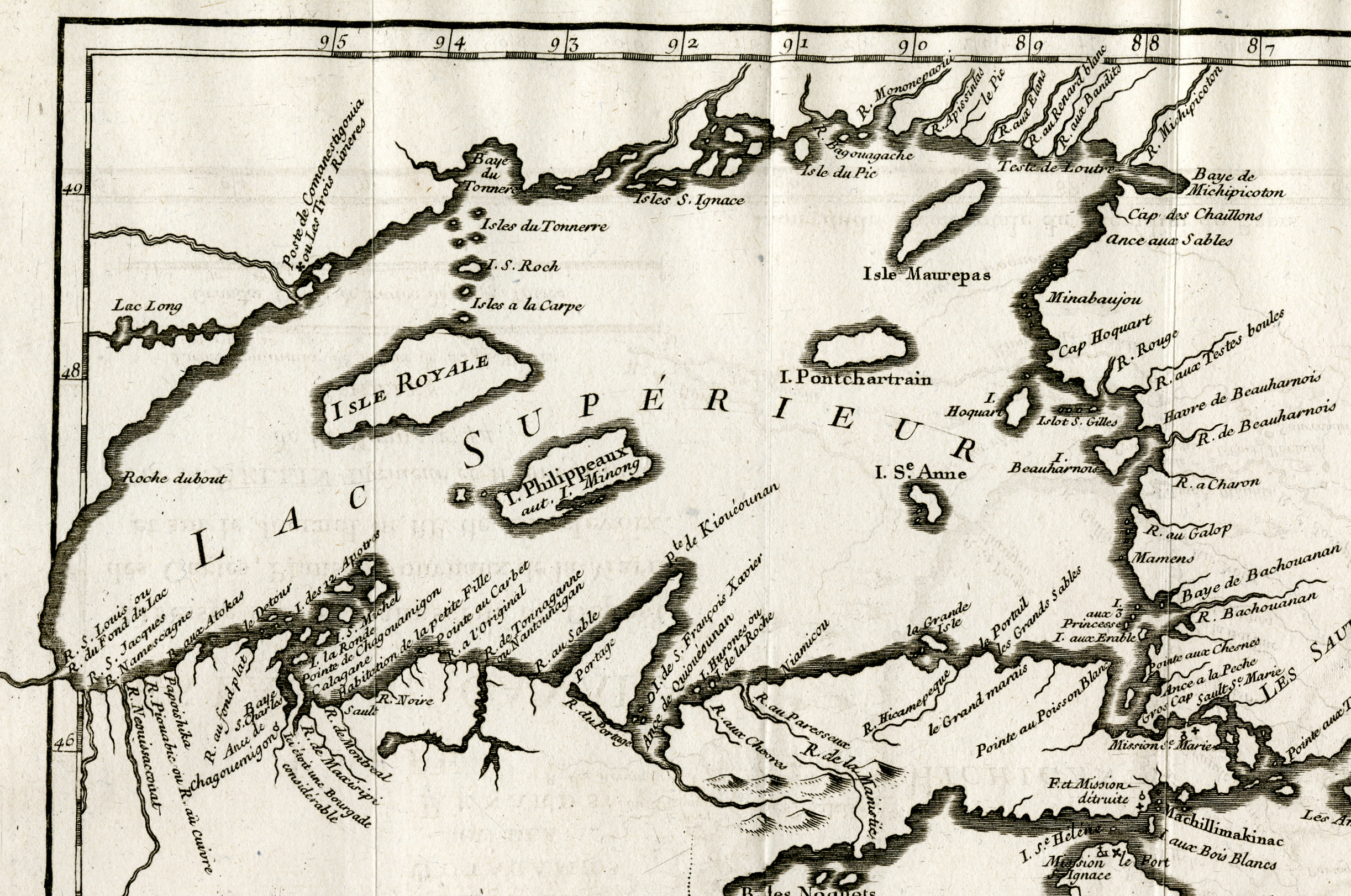
Jacques-Nicolas Bellin's "Carte des Lacs du Canada", showing Lake Superior and its islands, including Isles Royale, Philippeaux, Pontchartrain, Maurepas, and Saint Anne's.

Isle Phelipeaux or Isle Philippeaux – also called Isle Minong – is a phantom island supposedly located in Lake Superior. In the late 18th and early 19th centuries, it was believed to be real, and was shown on maps of the era. The island "Phelipeaux" is mentioned in the 1783 Treaty of Paris as a landmark defining the border between the United States and what would later become Canada.

It may be either a fabrication or a mistaken duplication of Isle Royale. Other prominent islands appearing on contemporary maps of Lake Superior which may or may not correspond to real islands are Pontchartrain, Maurepas, and St. Anne's.

== History ==
These four islands were described by priest and traveler Pierre François Xavier de Charlevoix, who named them in honor of his patron Louis Phélypeaux. Phélypeaux's titles included comte de Pontchartrain and comte de Maurepas, and his patron saint was Saint Anne.

The islands first appear on a 1742 proof of a map published in 1744 by Jacques-Nicolas Bellin, who used Charlevoix's journal as a source. That map and those based on it show "I. Philippeaux" as an island about the same size as Isle Royale, located midway between that island and the Keweenaw Peninsula. "I. Philippeaux" is drawn with features resembling the actual Isle Royale, and may be an accidental duplication of it under the name given by Charlevoix. The alternate name given by Bellin – "I. Minong" – had been previously applied to Isle Royale, which today bears a prominent ridge by that name.

Across the lake due east of Isle Royale on this map lies "I. Pontchartrain", which is oriented and positioned relative to the southeast shoreline of the lake similarly to Michipicoten Island (which does not appear on the map) and may represent it. Northeast of Pontchartrain is "Isle Maurepas", which has been speculated to be either a duplication of Michipicoten (whose shape it resembles), or a misrepresentation of the Slate Islands in the north of the lake (an area poorly represented by Bellin). South of "I. Pontchartrain" is "I. Se. Anne", whose relative size and position resemble that of Caribou Island.

The Mitchell Map with the islands on Lake Superior in it.

The islands appear essentially the same on the larger 1755 Mitchell Map of the colonies that would later comprise the United States of America, and surrounding territory. The Mitchell Map was widely used, and served as a reference in defining the border between the new United States and the remaining North American territories of the kingdom of George III, following the American Revolutionary War. The 1783 Treaty of Paris describes a portion of the boundary as running "through Lake Superior northward of the Isles Royal and Phelipeaux to the Long Lake. [sic]" During the 1820s, when surveyors were attempting to more precisely stake out the international boundary from Lake of the Woods to Lake Superior, it was determined that "Isle Phelipeaux" did not exist. Surveyors were also unable to determine what body of water was meant by the "Long Lake" referenced in the treaty, and instead followed the Pigeon River from Lake Superior into the Boundary Waters.

== See also ==
- 1844 Isle Royale Agreement
- Webster–Ashburton Treaty
