= Aurora Islands =

Phantom islands in the South Atlantic

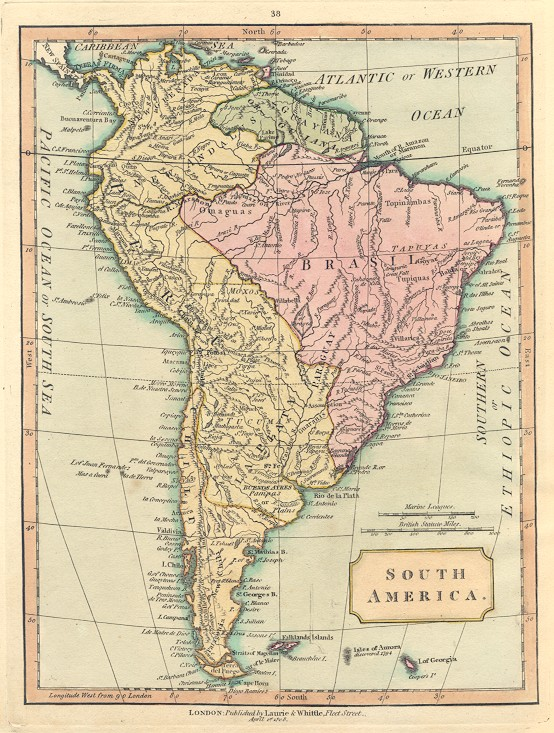
1808 map of South America showing "Isles of Aurora"

The Aurora Islands was a group of three phantom islands first reported in 1762 by the Spanish merchant ship Aurora while sailing from Lima to Cadiz. The officers of the Aurora reported sighting them again in 1774. The Spanish ship San Miguel fixed their location at 52°37'S, 47°49'W. On 20 February 1794, they were sighted again by a Spanish survey ship, the corvette Atrevida, which as part of the Alejandro Malaspina circumnavigation had been sent to confirm them. Their reported location was in the South Atlantic Ocean approximately halfway between the Falkland Islands and South Georgia at 53°S 48°W. The latitude is considered perfect; the longitude was based on the meridian of the astronomical observatory, San Fernando, Cádiz. The islands were last reportedly sighted in 1856, but continued to appear on maps of the South Atlantic until the 1870s.

It is possible that the Aurora islands were "discovered" by Amerigo Vespucci in his 1501–1502 voyage with a Portuguese expedition. In his "Lettera" of 1504, his most detailed note, he states that he left the coast of Brazil from Cabo Frío and followed the path of the Sirocco south-east covering 500 leagues (about 3000 kilometres) by sea down to 50°S or 52°S. The probability is confirmed by Vice-Admiral Ernesto Basilico in The Third Voyage of Amerigo Vespucci (Buenos Aires, 1967) and by Lt-Cdr Barreiro Meiro (General Journal of Navy, October 1968, Madrid). At latitude 52°S Vespucci discovered an island 20 leagues (118 kilometres) long:

We sailed so much with this wind (the Sirocco) that we found ourselves in latitudes so high that the midday fix was 52° above the horizon and we could no longer see the stars of the Little Bear nor the Big Bear constellations. This was the 3 April 1502. That day a storm blew up so strong that it made us furl all our sails and run with bare masts before strong winds from the south-east, enormous seas and stormy gusts. Such was the tempest that all the fleet was greatly fearful. The nights were very long, and the one of 7 April was of fifteen hours duration since the sun was at the end of Aries, and in this region it was winter, as Your Majesty can calculate. In the middle of this storm of 7 April we sighted a new land, which we sailed alongside of for almost 20 leagues, finding the coast wild, and we did not see any harbour or people. I believe because the cold was so intense that none of us could remedy it or bear it.

The only large islands in 52°S latitude were the as then undiscovered Falklands, but Vespucci's description does not fit the Falklands, whose low-lying coasts are full of coves for shelter and are not "wild". 3 April is not winter but the first month of autumn and a night of fifteen hours duration implies a mysterious shift of the sun; furthermore, sailors would not find the cold intolerable at that season of the year in 52°S. The suggestion of aberrant conditions accompanying a fierce storm is typical of a number of phantom islands, particularly Saint Brendan's Island.

Raymond Ramsay suggests several possible explanations for the persistent reports of sightings over the century from 1762, including a massive iceberg, the possibility that the Aurora Islands are the Shag Rocks, and the possibility that they sank, but dismisses them all. He concludes that "there is actually no wholly satisfactory explanation for the Aurora Islands and they remain one of the great unsolved mysteries of the sea". Commenting on Ramsay's dismissal of the possibility that they sank, Stephen Royle notes that several volcanic islands have been known to have disappeared in recent times.

They are the subject of a 2001 novel entitled Hippolyte's Island, by Barbara Hodgson, during which they are rediscovered by the book's protagonist. In an episode in Edgar Allan Poe's novel, The Narrative of Arthur Gordon Pym of Nantucket, Pym and his crewmates search for but fail to find them.

== See also ==
- Shag Rocks
- Pepys Island

== General and cited references ==
- Gould, Rupert T. (1944), "The Auroras, and Other Doubtful Islands", in Oddities: A Book of Unexplained Facts, revised ed., Geoffrey Bles, pp. 124–162. Reprinted by Kessinger Pub Co., 2003, ISBN 978-0-7661-3620-5.
- Ramsay, Raymond (1972). No Longer on the Map. Ballantine Books, pp 78–80.
- Royle, Stephen A. (2001). A Geography of Islands: Small Island Insularity. Routledge ISBN 978-1-85728-865-0.
- Stommel, Henry (1984). Lost Islands: The Story of Islands That Have Vanished from Nautical Charts. Vancouver: University of British Columbia Press, pp. 84–97. ISBN 0-7748-0210-3.
