= Juan de Lisboa =

Phantom island in the Indian Ocean

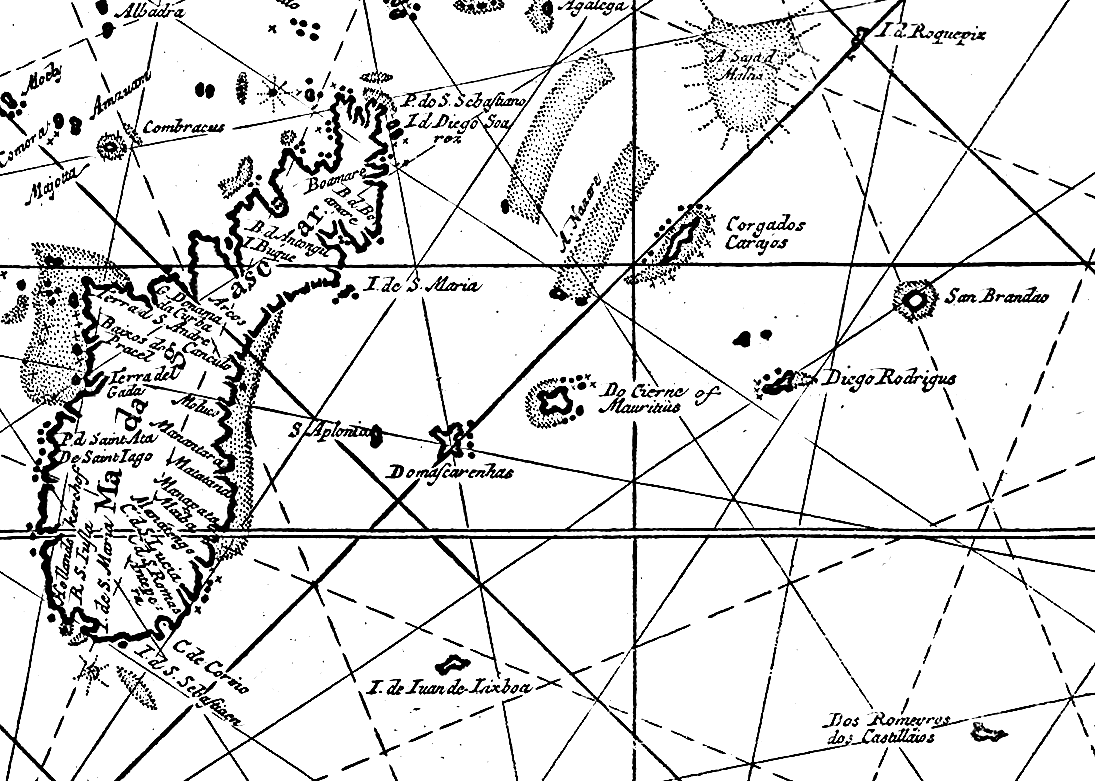
Detail from 1689 map by Johannes van Keulen, showing Juan de Lisboa to the southeast of Madagascar.

Juan de Lisboa is a phantom island in the Western Indian Ocean allegedly located southeast of Madagascar. It was reported on maps and charts of the 17th and 18th centuries, sometimes depicted alongside another phantom island, Dos Romeiros.
