= Torca Island =

Phantom island

Torca Island was an inhabited phantom island said to be located in the Indian Ocean, possibly in the East Indies. It purportedly vanished when a volcano erupted on 4 June 1693. The survivors escaped to a nearby island called Amboyna (present-day Ambon Island) on 18 July 1693. The villagers attempted to flee in canoes or by swimming, but many people died attempting to do this. Torca Island was said to be moderately sized.
