= Wachusett Reef =

Apparent phantom reef in the South Pacific

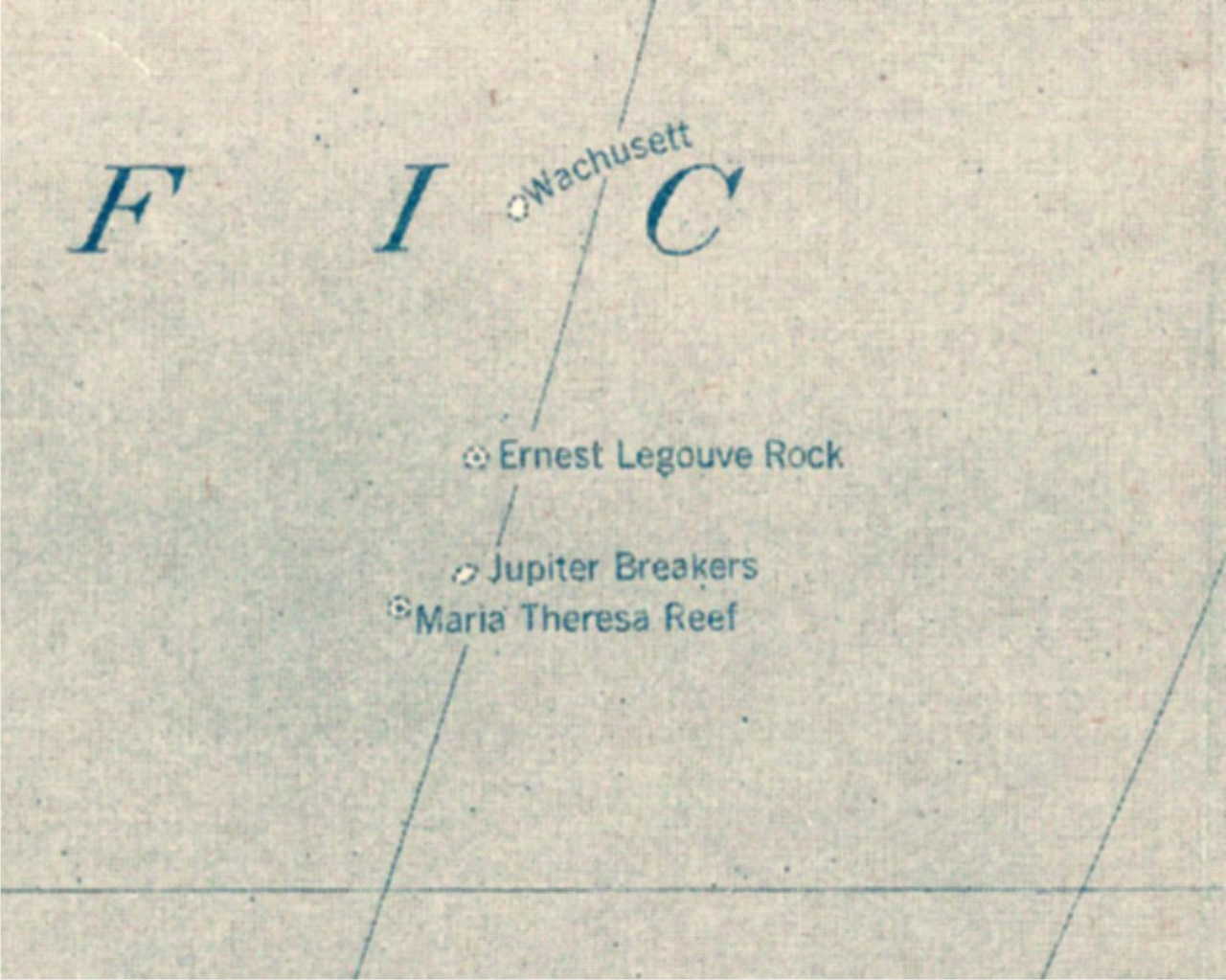
- Wachusett Reef on 1921 Pacific map

In-universe information
- Type: Phantom island

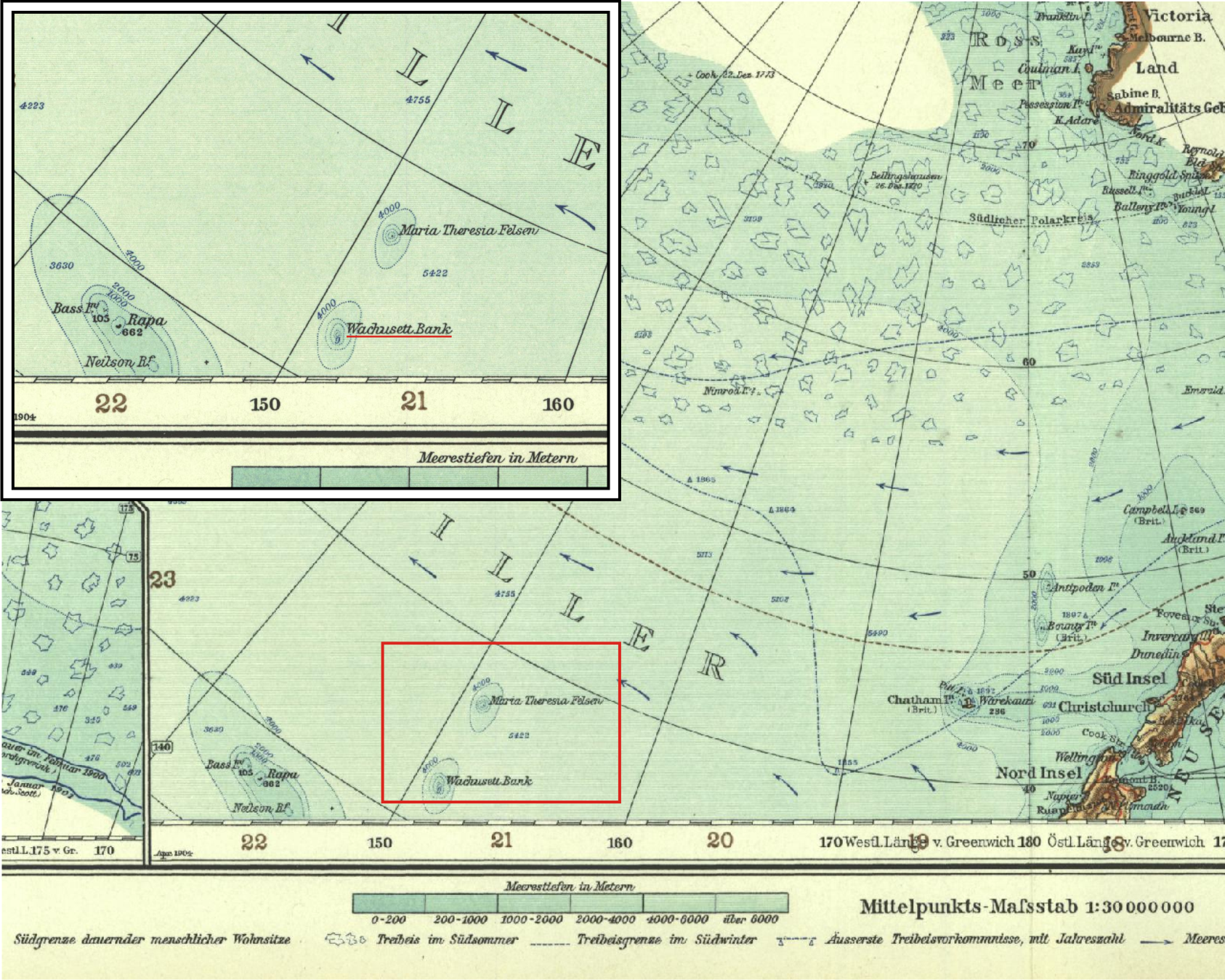
Wachusett Reef as "Wachusett Bank" on 1904 map of Antarctica

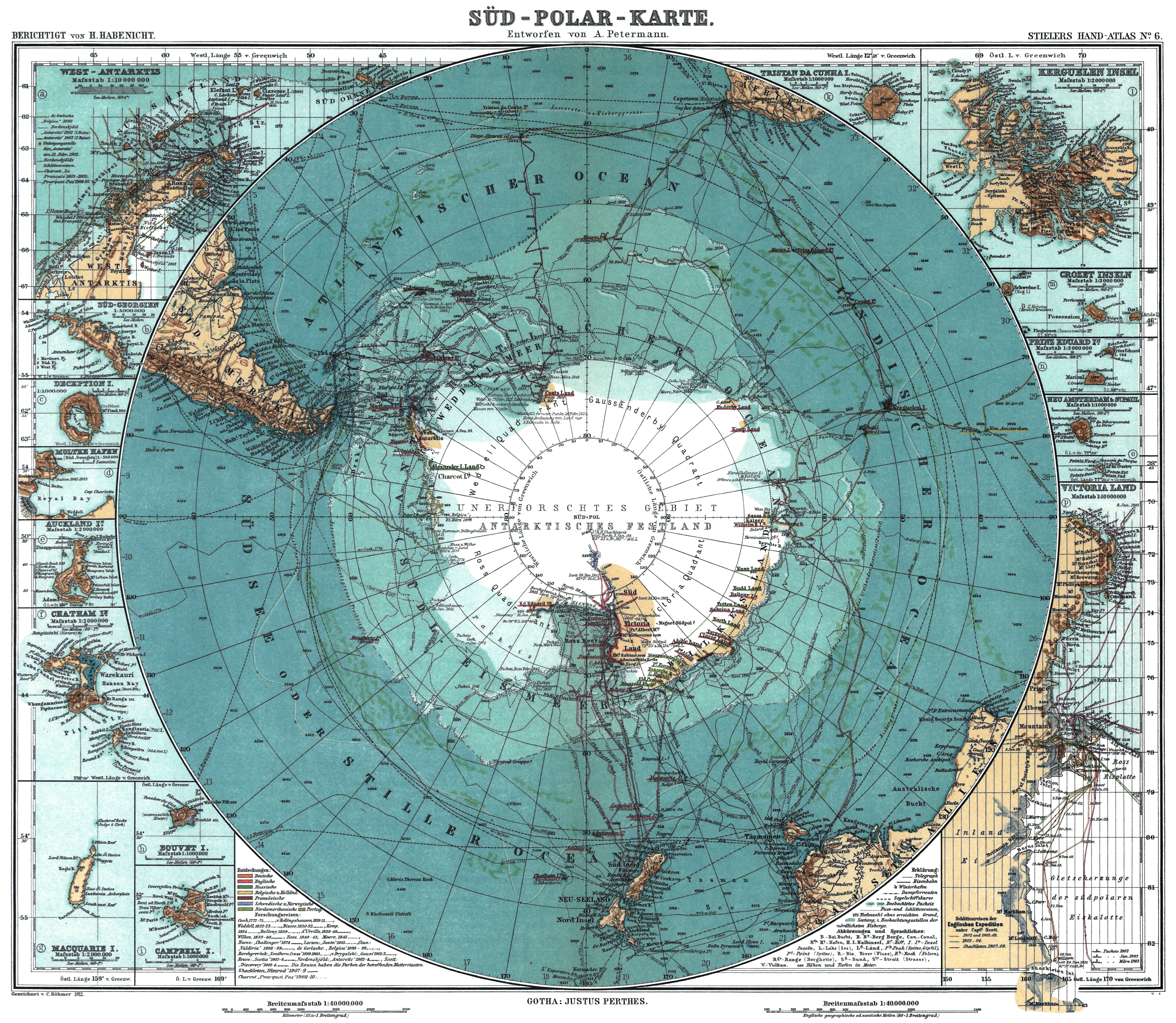
Historic Antarctic map of 1912 with "Wachusett Untiefe"

Wachusett Reef is a phantom reef in the Antarctic Ocean.

Captain Lambert of the ship Wachusett reported that on June 4, 1899, he passed over a reef which appeared to be of coral formation in approximately latitude 32°18′S 151°08′W . The reef appeared to be about 500 feet (150 m) wide. The bottom showed of a dark gray color with deep blue on both sides of the reef. The depth was estimated at from 5 to 6 fathoms (30 to 36 ft; 9.1 to 11.0 m); unfortunately no soundings were taken.

The 2015 edition of the National Geographic Atlas of the World still shows Wachusett Reef, with a depth of 9 metres (30 ft). Nevertheless, its existence is doubtful, making it a phantom reef. Other nearby historically reported reefs which appear to not exist include Ernest Legouve Reef, Jupiter Reef, and Maria Theresa Reef.
