= USS Petrel =

Four ships in the United States Navy have been named USS Petrel for the sea bird of the same name.

- USS Petrel (1846), a schooner purchased in 1846; later served in the United States Coast Survey
- USS Petrel (1862), a steamship, purchased in 1862; captured in 1864
- USS Petrel (PG-2), a gunboat, commissioned in 1889 and decommissioned in 1919
- USS Petrel (ASR-14), a Chanticleer-class submarine rescue ship; commissioned 24 September 1946; decommissioned on 30 September 1991

== See also ==
- USS Cobra (SP-626), a patrol boat in commission from 1917 to 1934 that served as the United States Bureau of Fisheries patrol boat Petrel from 1919 to 1934
