= Rivadeneyra Shoal =

Shoal in the Eastern Pacific Ocean

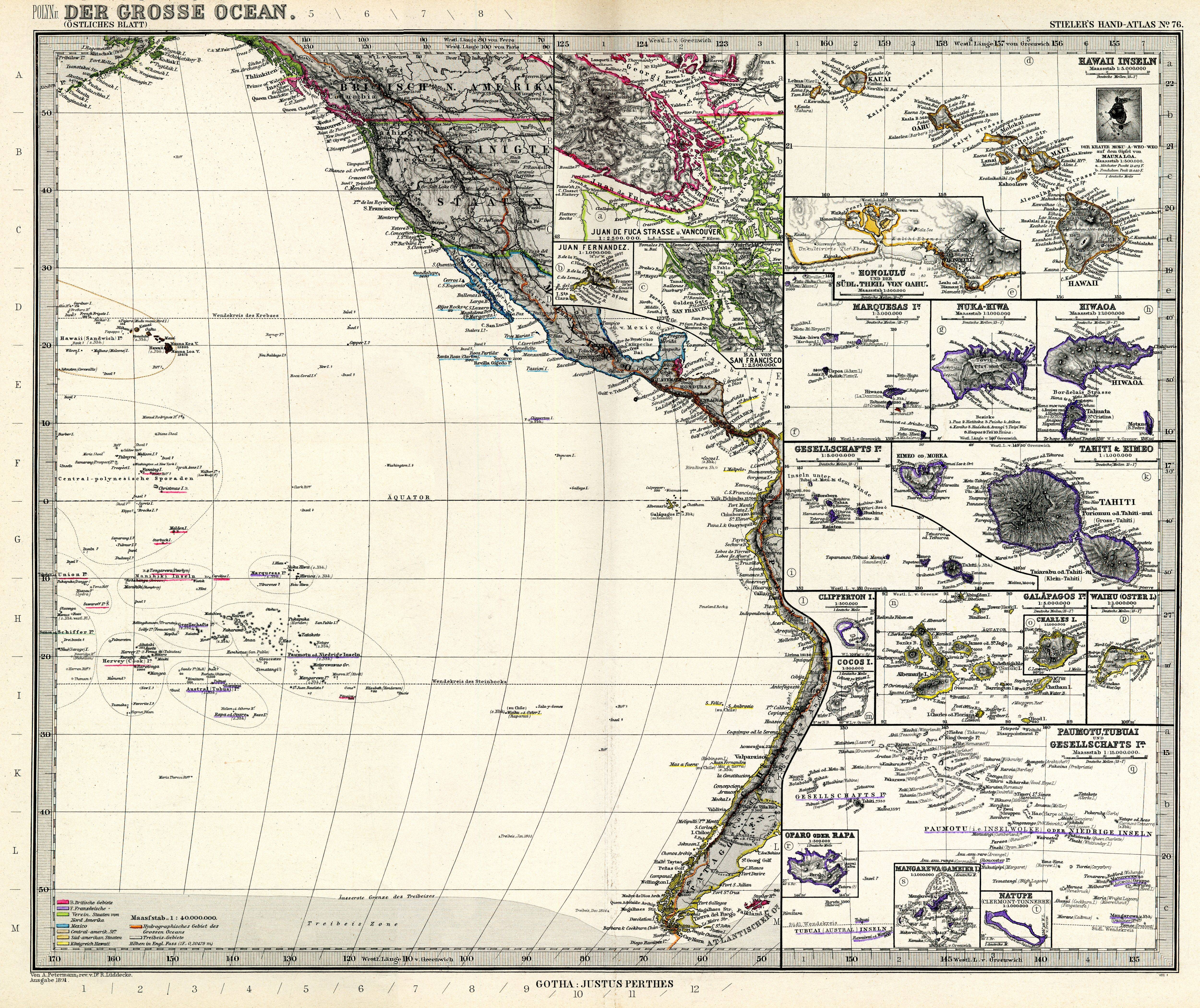
1891 German map showing Rivadeneyra Shoal.

Rivadeneyra Shoal is a shoal or seamount in the Eastern Pacific Ocean between Malpelo Island and Cocos Island. It was reported in October 1842 at the position 4°15′N 85°10′W with a depth of 10 feet. It was unsuccessfully searched for by the British war vessels HMS Cockatrice and HMS Havannah in 1854 and 1857 respectively, and by the USS Mohican in 1885.

== Sources ==
- Findlay, Alexander George (1851). A Directory for the Navigation of the Pacific Ocean. London: Laurie, p 1054.
- Great Britain Hydrographic Office (1860). South America Pilot: Including Magellan Strait, the Falkland and Galapagos Islands. Eyre and Spottiswoode, p 394.
- Stommel, Henry (1984). Lost Islands: The Story of Islands That Have Vanished from Nautical Charts. Vancouver: University of British Columbia Press, p 113. ISBN 0-7748-0210-3.
