= William Hack =

English cartographer

- Occupation: Cartographer

William Hack, or Hacke, (fl. 1671–1702) was an English cartographer. He made over 300 navigational charts from 1682 to 1702.
