= Sarah Ann Island =

Phantom island

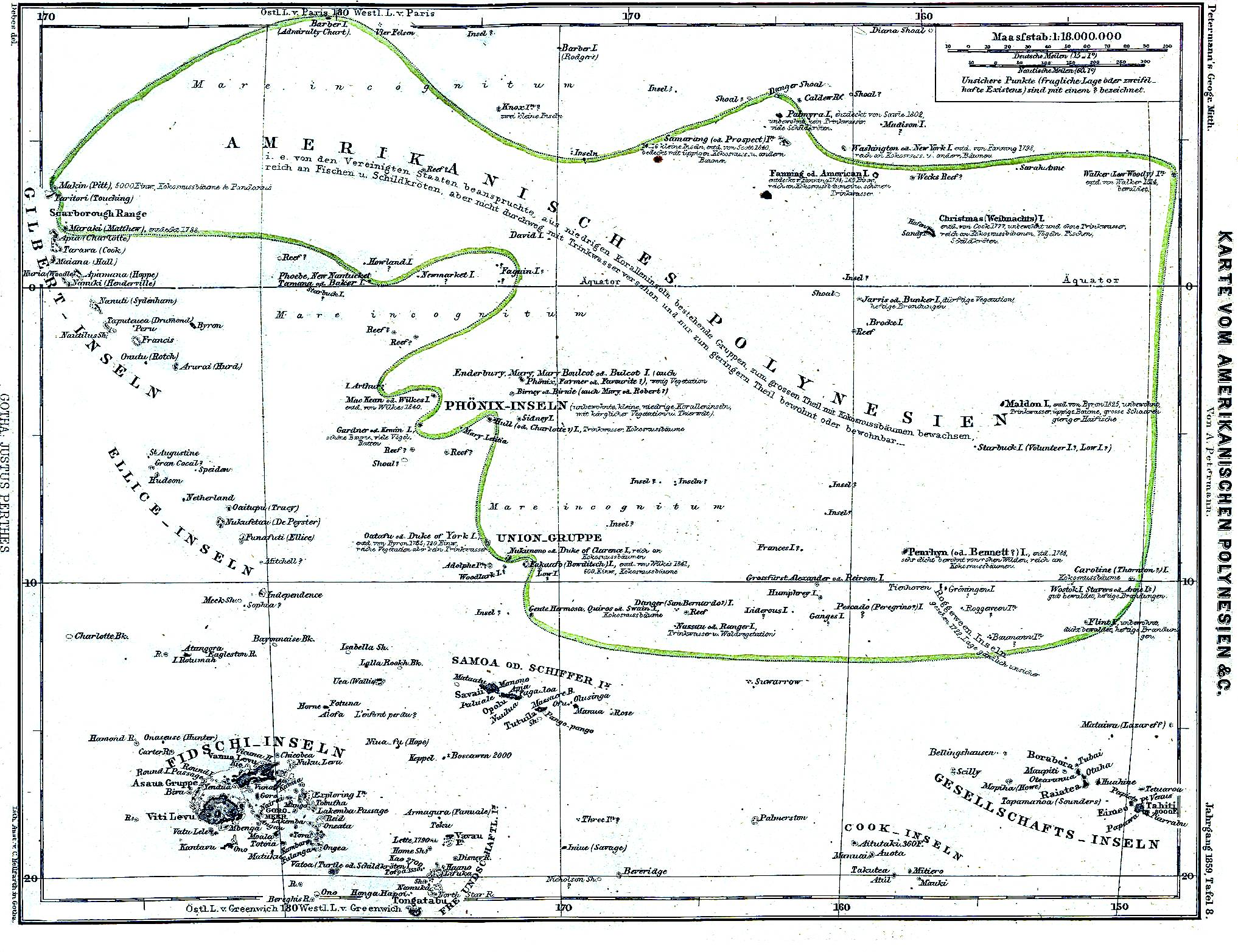
Map of Polynesia from 1859. Sarah Ann (here spelled Sarah Anne) is in the top right corner

Sarah Ann Island (also spelled Sarah Anne) is a vanished island, previously located at 4°0′N 154°22′W (though sometimes listed at about 175° W). It was supposedly discovered in 1858 by Captain William W. Taylor and reported to the U.S. State Department on February 12, 1859, along with 41 other atolls and islands he claimed under the Guano Islands Act. Taylor assigned his interest in Sarah Ann Island (referred to as Sarah Anne) and the other islands to the U.S. Guano Company of New York, which bonded them with the U.S. Treasury Department in February 1860; however, a 1933 review of Guano Islands Act claims found no evidence that the island was ever mined. Furthermore, the report noted that no island could be found at the reported coordinates of 4° 0' N, 154° 22' W.

A search in 1932 by German astronomers was unsuccessful. In 1937, the United States Pacific Fleet attempted to locate the island, intending to establish an observatory there to view the solar eclipse of June 8, 1937, but was also unsuccessful. The island, which had been observed 15 years before, was nowhere to be found. Instead, observations were made on the nearby Canton and Enderbury Islands and Sarah Ann was quietly removed from Naval charts and has become a phantom island.

One explanation is that Sarah Ann Island was actually Malden Island, but due to a clerical error it was listed at 4° N instead of 4° S.
