= Bermeja =

Phantom island in the Gulf of Mexico

Coordinates: 22°33′N 91°22′W

- El Yucatán e Islas Adyacentes location
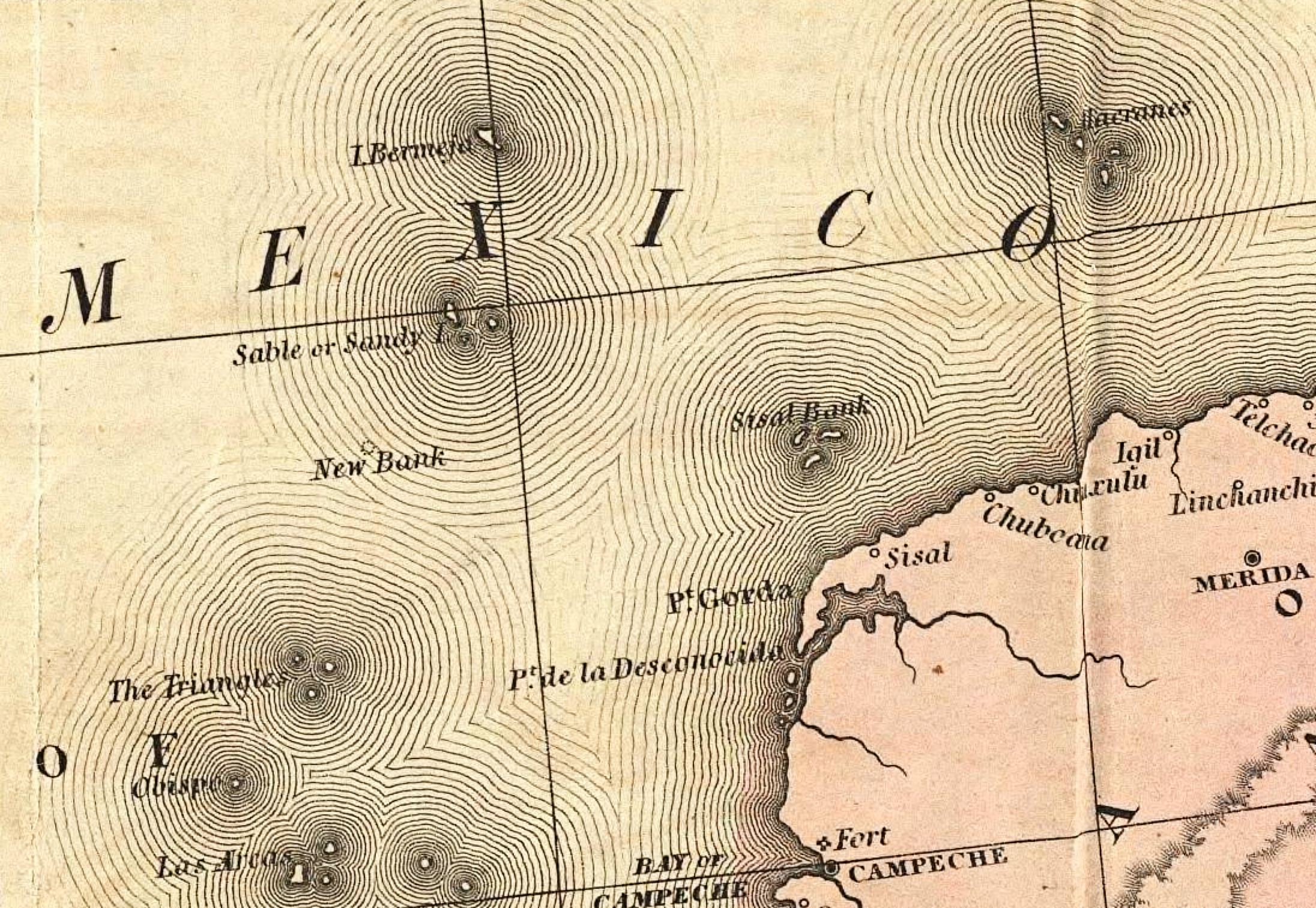
- An 1846 map showing "I. Bermeja".
- Created by: Alonso de Santa Cruz

In-universe information
- Type: Phantom island

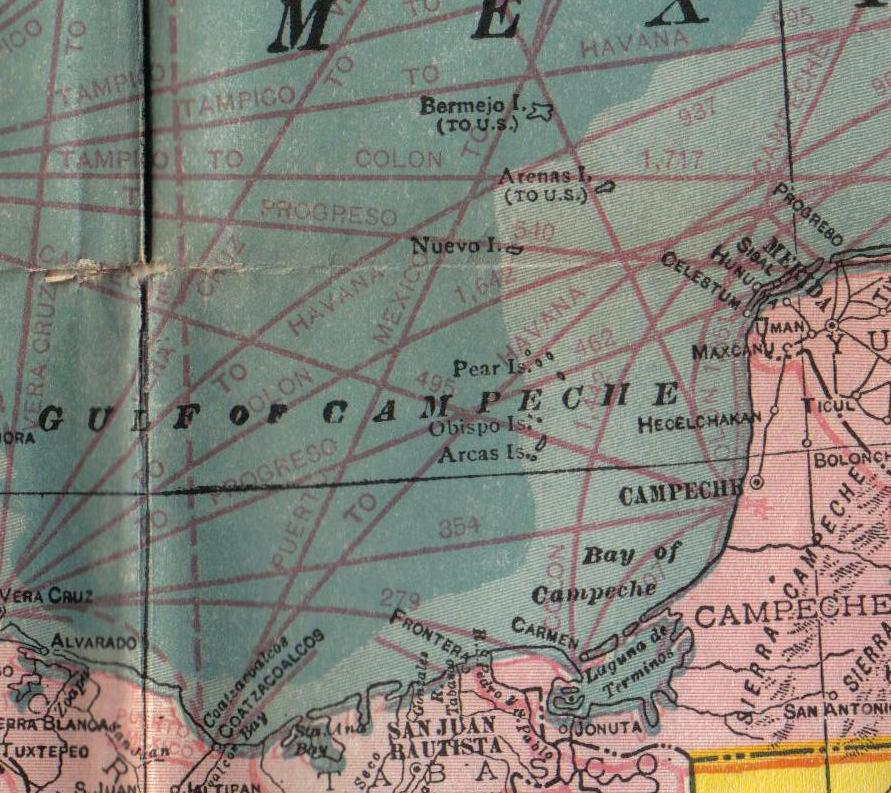
A 1914 map showing U.S. claim on "Bermejo I."

Alleged location of Bermeja

Bermeja is a phantom islet once thought to lie off the north coast of the Yucatán Peninsula according to several maps of the Gulf of Mexico from the 16th to the 20th centuries. Despite being located somewhat precisely in relation to neighboring islands by notable Spanish cartographers of the 16th century, the island was not found in a 1997 survey, nor in an extensive 2009 study conducted by the National Autonomous University of Mexico (UNAM) on behalf of the Mexican Chamber of Deputies. Interest in the island arose in late 2008, fueled by the fact that if such an island existed, it would be important for determining the boundaries for exploitation rights of oil in Hoyos de Dona (Doughnut Holes) in the Gulf of Mexico.

The island was first mentioned by Alonso de Santa Cruz in El Yucatán e Islas Adyacentes, a list of islands of the region published in Madrid in 1539. Its precise location is given in Espejo de navegantes (Seville, ca. 1540) by Alonso de Chaves, who wrote that from a distance, the small island looks "blondish or reddish" (in Spanish: bermeja). According to Michel Antochiw Kolpa, a French-Mexican cartographer, since 1844 British maps have reported the sinking of the island some 60 fathoms (360 ft; 110 m) below.

== Modern search ==
During negotiations between the United States and Mexico over the rights to drill for oil in the vicinity from 2008 to 2009 the Mexican government insisted that the Island existed, as it would greatly expand Mexico's EEZ and launched official searches for it to no avail.

Explanations for its apparent disappearance include an erroneous observation by the early cartographers, shifts in the geography of the ocean floor, rising sea levels, and conspiracy theories claiming that the Central Intelligence Agency destroyed the island to expand the exclusive economic zone allotted to the United States. In November 2008 six Mexican Senators raised parliamentary questions citing suspicions that the United States had secretly destroyed the island for more negotiating leverage. Both TV Azteca and the National Autonomous University of Mexico also performed their own searches and failed to find either the island, a sand bank, nor evidence of drastic shifts in the ocean floor.
