= Ernest Legouve Reef =

Phantom island in South Pacific

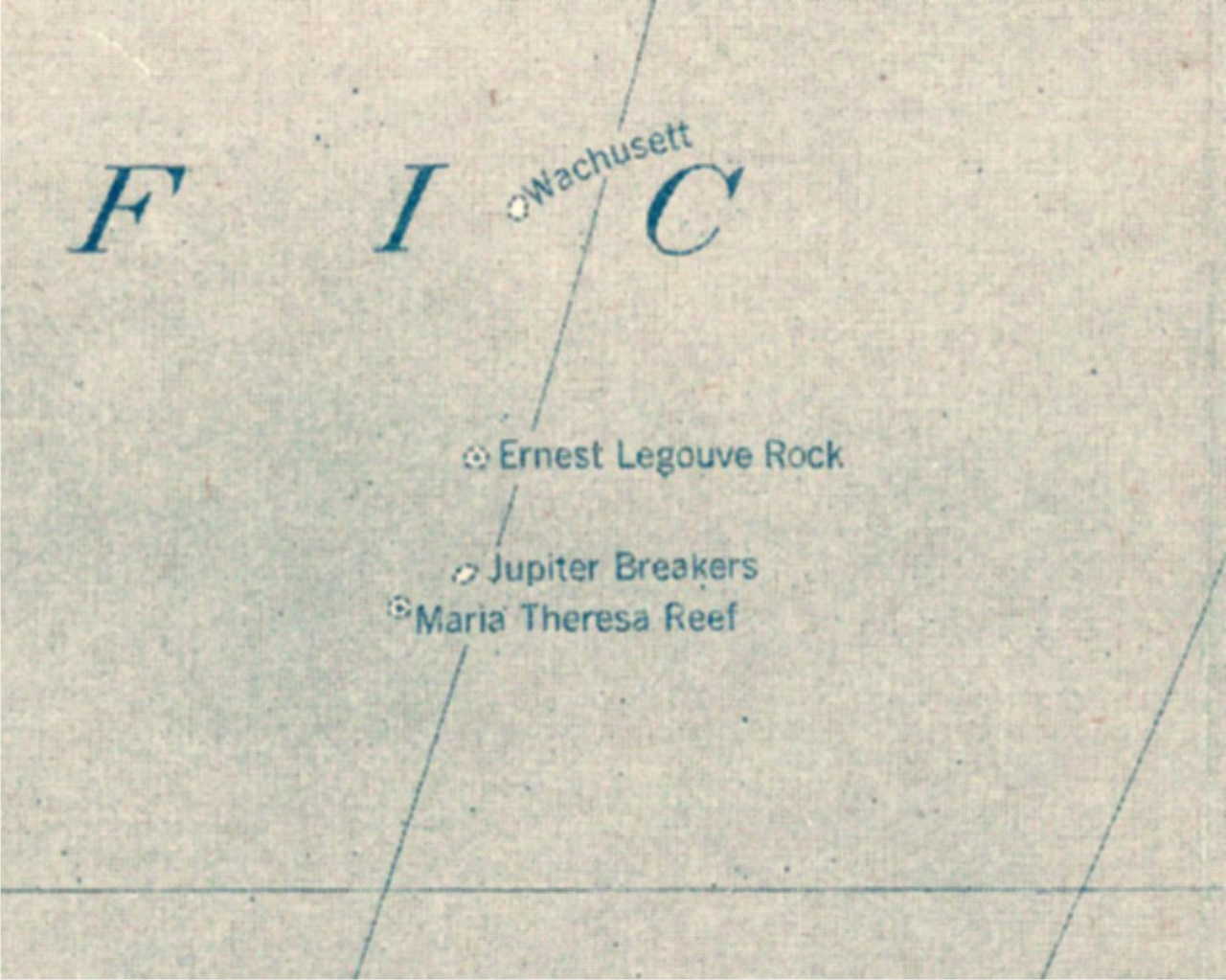
- Ernest Legouve Rock on 1921 Pacific map
- Created by: Ernest‑Legouvé

In-universe information
- Type: Phantom island

Alleged location of Ernest Legouve Reef in the Pacific Ocean

The Ernest Legouve Reef is a phantom reef supposed to be located in the South Pacific, south of the French Tuamotu Islands and east of New Zealand. Krauth reports that it is situated at 35°12′S 150°40′W.

According to a statement of the International Hydrographic Bureau (February 9, 1957), it "was reported in 1902 by the captain of the French ship the Ernest‑Legouvé. The reef was about 100 meters long and another reef was sighted near it." It was recorded the same year in the "Paris Notice to Mariners 164/1122/1902." While it is absent from the 1859 Admiralty Chart, it is unclear if the 1902 sighting is the very first one by the Ernest‑Legouvé or another ship bearing that name.

It was searched for in 1982 and 1983 but not found, leading to it being considered a phantom island. Nevertheless, it is marked in the 2015 edition of the National Geographic Atlas of the World.

Other nearby historically reported reefs which appear to not exist include Wachusett Reef, Jupiter Reef and Maria Theresa Reef (also known as Tabor Island, appearing in Jules Verne's In Search of the Castaways and The Mysterious Island).

== Jules Verne's The Mysterious Island ==
In its location and description, the Ernest Legouve Reef could be considered the real-life approximation of the remains of the fictional "Lincoln Island" of Jules Verne's The Mysterious Island. The novel places the island, before its explosion, very close by, at 34°57′S 150°30′W. After its explosion, it is described – in the Sidney Kravitz translation – as "An isolated rock, thirty feet long, fifteen wide, emerging barely ten feet above the water." The formation is referred to as a "reef" four times after its explosion.

Interestingly, the character, Cyrus Harding, says with surprise after his fellow colonists and he are rescued, "This island isn't even marked on the maps!" But, since their rescue, "this reef [will] henceforth figure on the maps of the Pacific." If Verne is referring to real maps or current sightings, these would be as of 1873–1874.

The reef may also resemble the islet that the castaways first land on, about a half mile off of the coast of Lincoln Island. Verne describes it as "a tiny islet that did not measure more than two miles in length and much less in width." The islet "occupied a narrow strip of the sea and, although larger in scale, resembled the body of an enormous whale. Its width even at its greatest point was not more than a quarter of a mile." And since it was only separated from Lincoln Island by a narrow channel, it could easily be conflated for Lincoln Island itself in its coordinates.

In Verne's 1870 novel, Twenty Thousand Leagues Under the Seas, the main characters spend a couple of days on a so-called "Gueboroar Island" (possibly Gabba Island, or Golboa), which contains many similarities with the fictional Mysterious Island.

Further association between fact and fiction comes from Vernian scholar, William Butcher. He explains that the real-life man, Ernest Legouvé (1807–1903), "was a friend of Verne's who promised to help satisfy his cherished ambition of joining the Académie française" and so "there may be a hidden connection somewhere" (xxiv).^{a}

While we know Ernest Legouve Reef is absent from the 1859 Admiralty Chart, it is unknown if the supposed 1902 sighting of this island/islet/reef by the ship named after Verne's friend is the very first claimed sighting after 1859.

Butcher writes at length about how meticulously researched The Mysterious Island is. If the same ship, or another Ernest-Legouvé vessel, had also sighted the reef before or around the time of Verne's writing (1873–1874), then Verne could be corroborating this sighting and putting his friend "on the map," by using the reef's coordinates and description in the novel, in exchange for access to the Académie.

It would be a strange coincidence indeed for a reef to be discovered by a ship named after Verne's friend at coordinates that Verne wrote into a novel 30 years before the discovery, and there not be some connection. As Butcher concludes: "Just as the missing day in Around the World emerges in the most surprising places, so the Mystery of the Island is a wide-ranging one."

== Notes ==
- ^a Legouvé also happened to be a fellow contributor to the French Magazine, Le Magasin d'éducation et de récréation, during the same year in which it first published Verne's, The Mysterious Island, in installments (i.e. 1874–1875)(Butcher, "Inception of the novel," xliii)
