= Groclant =

Phantom island west of Greenland

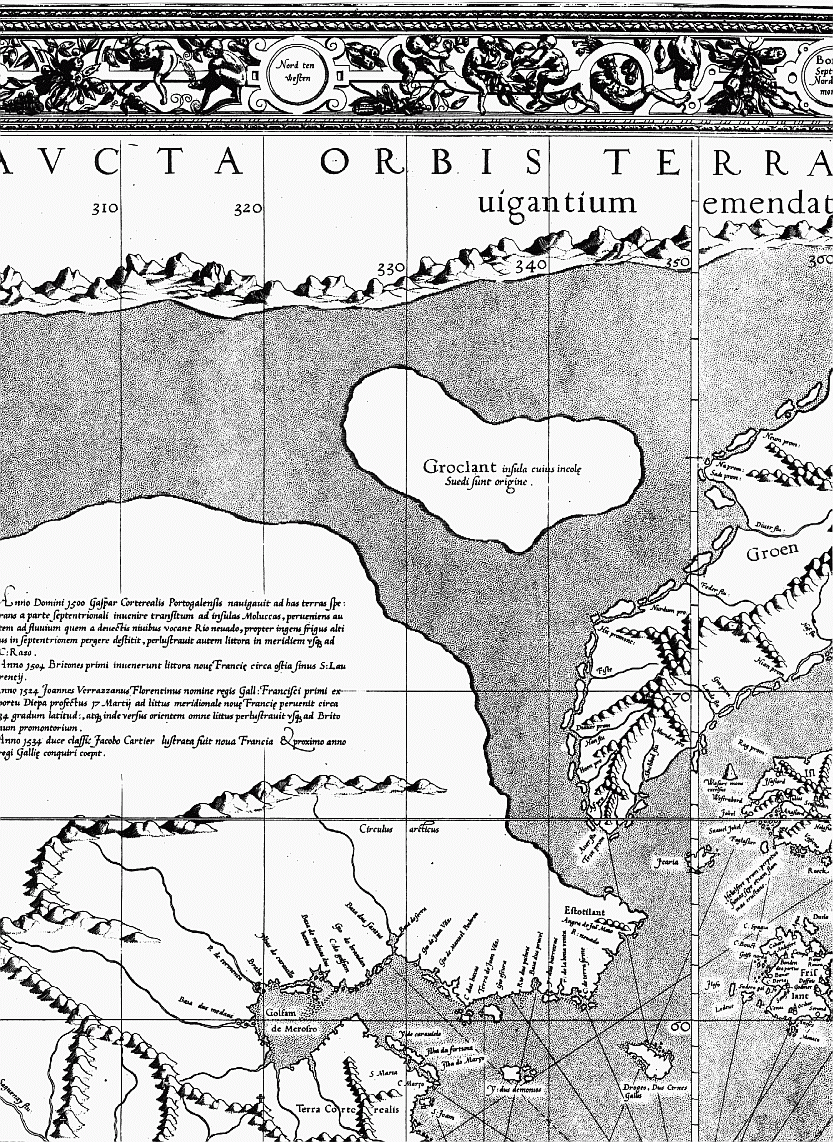
Groclant on the Mercator map.

Groclant is the name of a phantom island generally shown off the western side of Greenland, first appearing on maps in the late 16th century. The name of the island may be an errant reading of Greenland.

One of the first maps to show Groclant was a Mercator map from 1569, where it appeared west of Groenlant. The island was labeled on the map as being inhabited by Swedes. One of the last maps to feature Groclant was a Quadus map of 1608. Modern speculation has theorized that Groclant may be Baffin Island, north of Labrador, in northern Canada.
