= Candyn =

Phantom Asian island

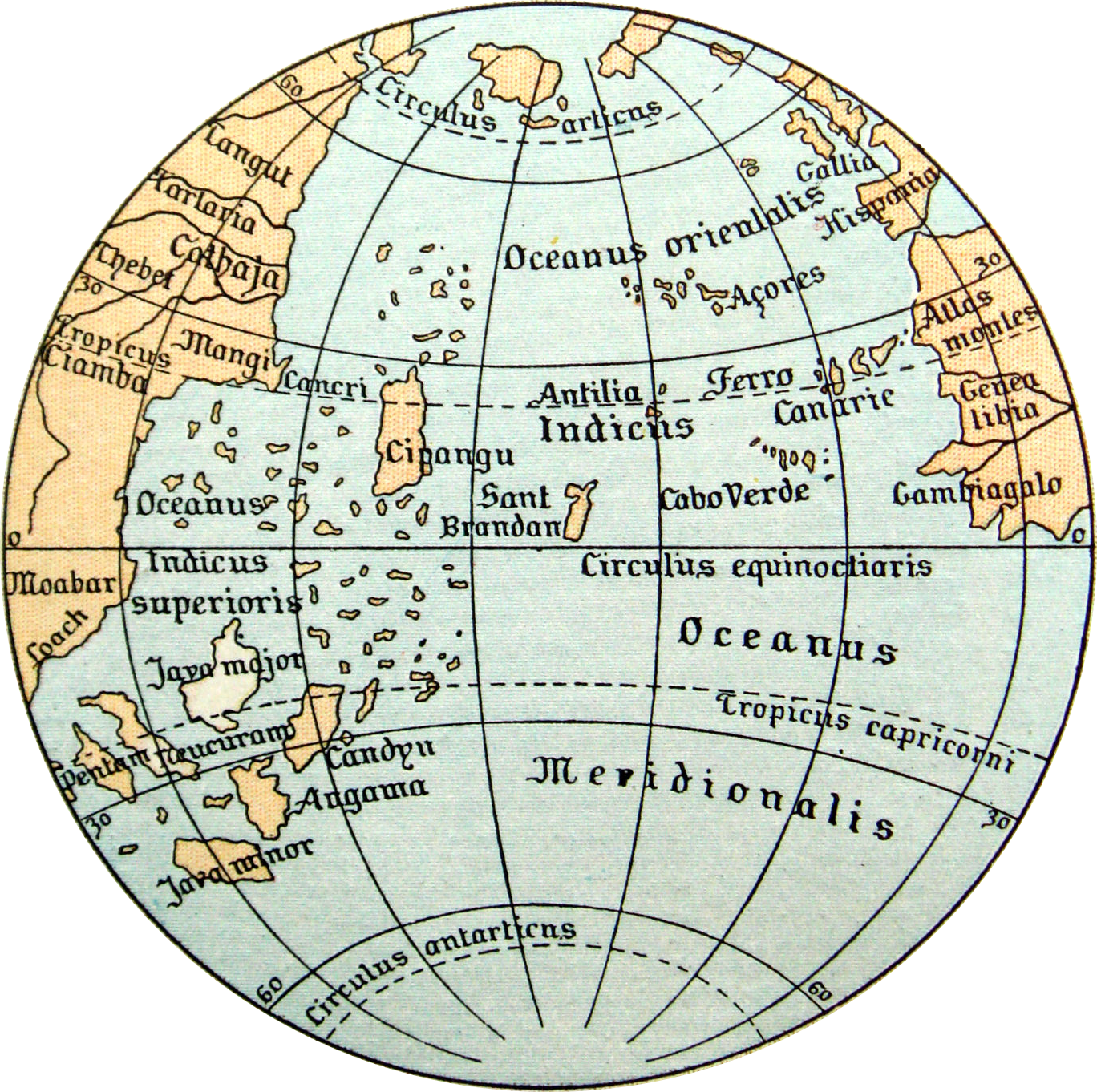
Behaim's 1492 globe features Candyn south of Java major.

Candyn (also spelled Candin or Candy) was a supposed remote east-Asian island around the turn of the 15th century.

On the 1457 Genoese map there is an island of Candia, with a report of a "large fish" being captured and brought back to Venice.

It can be found on Martin Behaim's globe in 1492, where he described it as being: "foot against foot with respect to our land, and when it is day with us they have night" (in other words, in the antipodes).

It appeared on the 1507 map of Johannes Ruysch, the Waldseemüller map, and the Johannes Schöner globe.

It may be identified with Odoric's island of "Dondin".

Although speculation has linked it with Ceylon or Indonesian islands, no positive determination has been made matching Candyn with any known physical location.
