= Antillia =

15th-century phantom island

- Portolan chart location
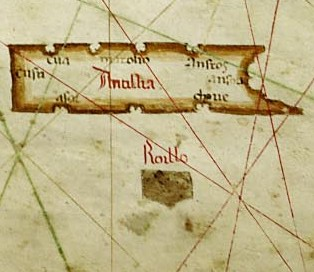
- Map of Albino de Canepa, dated 1489. Phantom island of Antillia, with its Seven Cities, on top; the smaller companion island of Roillo is below it

In-universe information
- Type: Phantom island
- Location: Atlantic Ocean

Antillia or Antilia is a phantom island that was reputed, during the 15th-century age of exploration, to lie in the Atlantic Ocean, far to the west of Portugal and Spain. The island also went by the name of Isle of Seven Cities (Portuguese: Ilha das Sete Cidades; Spanish: Isla de las Siete Ciudades).

It originates from an old Iberian legend, set during the Muslim conquest of Hispania c. 714. Seeking to flee from the Muslim conquerors, seven Christian Visigothic bishops embarked with their flocks on ships and set sail westwards into the Atlantic Ocean, eventually landing on an island (Antillia) where they founded seven settlements.

The island makes its first explicit appearance as a large rectangular island in the 1424 portolan chart of Zuane Pizzigano. Thereafter, it routinely appeared in most nautical charts of the 15th century. After 1492, when the north Atlantic Ocean began to be routinely sailed and became more accurately mapped, depictions of Antillia gradually disappeared. It nonetheless lent its name to the Spanish Antilles.

The routine appearance of such a large "Antillia" in 15th-century nautical charts has led to speculation that it might represent the American landmass, and has fueled many theories of pre-Columbian trans-oceanic contact.

== Legend ==
A full image of Canepa's 1489 map, featuring Antillia (on the west) in relation to the Iberian Peninsula.

Stories of islands in the Atlantic Ocean, legendary and otherwise, have been reported since classical antiquity. Utopian tales of the Fortunate Islands (or Isles of the Blessed) were sung by poets like Homer and Horace. Plato articulated the utopian legend of Atlantis. Ancient writers like Plutarch, Strabo, and, more explicitly, Pliny the Elder and Ptolemy, testified to the existence of the Canary Islands. The names of some real islands re-emerged as distinct mythical islands with associated legends, e.g. capraria (the island of goats) and canaria (the island of dogs) are often found on maps separately from the Canary Islands (e.g. Pizzigani brothers, 1367).

The Middle Ages saw the emergence of Christian versions of these tales. Notable among these are the Irish immrama (tales of a hero's journey to the Otherworld), such as the immram of Uí Corra, or the sea voyages of the 6th-century Irish missionaries Saint Brendan and Saint Malo. These are the source for several legendary Atlantic islands such as Saint Brendan's Island and the Island of Ima. The sagas of Norse seafarers to Greenland and Vinland, notably the Grœnlendinga saga and the saga of Erik the Red, have also been influential. Norse encounters with North American indigenous peoples seem to have filtered into Irish immrama.

The peoples of the Iberian Peninsula, who were closest to the real Atlantic islands of the Canaries, Madeira and Azores, and whose seafarers and fishermen may have seen and even visited them, articulated their own tales. Medieval Andalusian Arabs related stories of Atlantic island encounters in the legend (told by al-Masudi) of the 9th-century navigator Khashkhash of Cordoba and the 12th-century story (told by al-Idrisi) of the eight Maghrurin (Wanderers) of Lisbon.

Given the tendency of the legends of different seafarers – Greek, Norse, Irish, Arab and Iberian – to cross-fertilize and influence each other, the exact source of some legendary Atlantic islands – such as the mythical islands of Brasil and the Isle of Mam – are extremely difficult to disentangle.

It is from Christian Iberia that the legend of Antillia emerged. According to the legend, in c. 714, during the Muslim conquest of Hispania, seven Christian bishops of Visigothic Hispania, led by the Bishop of Porto, embarked with their parishioners on ships and set sail westward into the Atlantic Ocean to escape the Arab conquerors. They stumbled upon an island and decided to settle there, burning their ships to permanently sever their link to their now Muslim-dominated former homeland. The bishops erected seven settlements (the "Seven Cities") on the island. In one reading (from Grazioso Benincasa), the seven cities are named Aira, Antuab, Ansalli, Ansesseli, Ansodi, Ansolli and Con.

The legend, in this form, is told in various places. The principal source is an inscription on Martin Behaim's 1492 Nuremberg globe which reads (in English translation):

In the year 734 after the birth of Christ, when all Spain was overrun by the miscreants of Africa, this Island of Antillia, called also the Isle of the Seven Cities, was peopled by the Archbishop of Porto with six other bishops, and certain companions, male and female, who fled from Spain with their cattle and property. In the year 1414, a Spanish ship approached very near this Island.

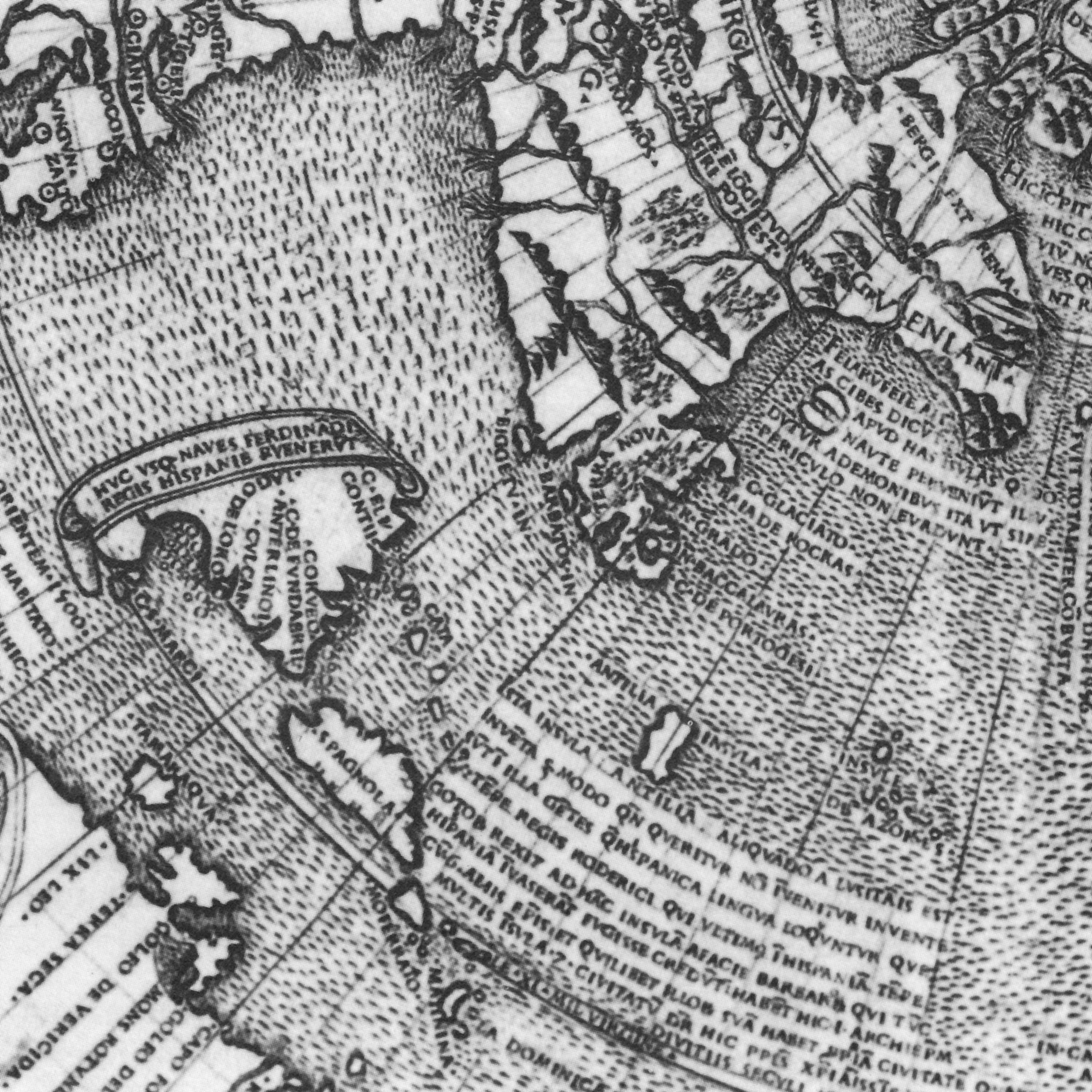
Inscription of Johannes Ruysch, 1508. The Isle of Demons further north may be Antillia's old companion, Satanazes.

The legend is also found inscribed in the 1507/08 map of Johannes Ruysch, which reads (in English):

This island Antilia was once found by the Portuguese, but now when it is searched, cannot be found. People found here speak the Hispanic language, and are believed to have fled here in face of a barbarian invasion of Hispania, in the time of King Roderic, the last to govern Hispania in the era of the Goths. There is 1 archbishop here and 6 other bishops, each of whom has his own city; and so it is called the island of seven cities. The people live here in the most Christian manner, replete with all the riches of this century.

Ruysch's inscription is reproduced almost verbatim in the Libro of Spanish historian Pedro de Medina (1548). Medina gives the island's dimensions as 87 leagues in length and 28 in width, with "many good ports and rivers", and says it is situated on the latitude of the Straits of Gibraltar, that sailors have seen it from a distance, but disappears when they approach it.

The adjustment to the 714 date and the burning of the ships is due to Ferdinand Columbus (1539), who also reports an alleged encounter with the islanders by a Portuguese ship in the time of Henry the Navigator (c. 1430s–1440s). António Galvão (1563) reports that a 1447 Portuguese ship stumbled on the island, and met its (Portuguese-speaking) inhabitants, who reported they had fled there in the "time of Roderic" and asked whether the Moors still dominated Hispania. More elaborate versions of this story have been told in more modern times.

Yet another variant of the tale is told in Manuel de Faria e Sousa (1628), of Sacaru, a Visigothic governor of Mérida. Besieged by the Muslim armies and finding his situation hopeless, Sacaru negotiated capitulation, and proceeded, with all who wished to follow him, to embark on a fleet for exile in the Canary islands. Faria e Sousa notes they may not have reached their destination, but may have ended up instead on an Atlantic Ocean island "populated by Portuguese, that has seven cities ... which some imagine to be that one which can be seen from Madeira, but when they wish to reach it, disappears".

The island is mentioned in a royal letter of King Afonso V of Portugal (dated 10 November 1475), where he grants the knight Fernão Teles "the Seven Cities and any other populated islands" he might find in the western Atlantic Ocean. It is mentioned again in a royal letter (dated 24 July 1486), issued by King John II of Portugal at the request of Fernão Dulmo authorizing him to search for and "discover the island of Seven Cities".

Already by the 1490s, there are rumors that silver can be found in the island's sands. In the 16th century, the legend gave rise to the independent Spanish legends of the Seven Cities of Gold, reputed by mercenary conquistadors to be fabulously wealthy and located somewhere on the mainland of America.

== Etymology ==
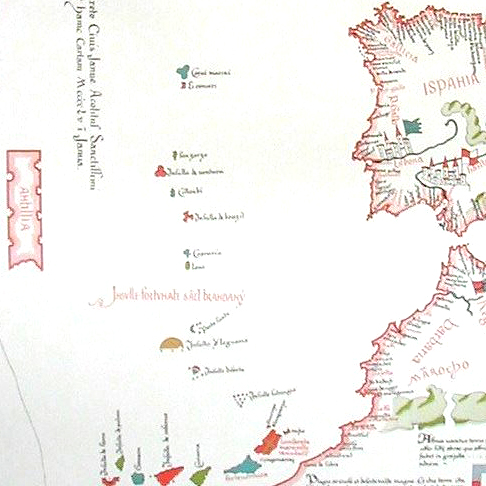
1455 map of Bartolomeo Pareto. Antilia is the large island on the western edge.

The term Antillia is probably derived from the Portuguese "Ante-Ilha" ("Fore-Island", "Island of the Other", or "Opposite Island"). It may be a reference to the belief that the island lay directly "opposite" from mainland Portugal (as it is usually charted), consistent with the Seven Cities story. Its size and rectangular shape is a near-mirror image of the Kingdom of Portugal itself. Some suggest the ante-ilha etymology might be older, possibly related in meaning to the "Aprositus" ("the Inaccessible"), the name reported by Ptolemy for one of the Fortunate Isles.

Others regard the "ante-ilha" etymology as unsatisfactory, on the basis that "ante", in geographical usage, suggests it sits opposite another island, not a continent. As a result, alternative etymological theories of Antillia abound. One theory was that "Antillia" is merely a poorly-transcribed reference to Plato's "Atlantis". Another is that it is a corruption of Getulia, an ancient Roman name for a geographical location in northwestern Africa. Another theory, famously forwarded by Alexander von Humboldt, is that it comes from the Arabic al-Tin or al-Tennyn, for "dragon", a reference to the old Arab legends about sea dragons on the edge of the ocean (frequently depicted in Arab maritime charts), and that the island may have been known as Jezirat al Tennyn, or "Dragon's Isle", in Andalusian Arab legend.

One more recent hypothesis (although not finding wide acceptance), is that Antillia may mean "in front of Thule". Sometimes written Tile, Thule was a semi-mythical reference to Iceland, already spoken of in classical sources. If so, then ante Tile, the "island before Thule", might very well be Ireland, which might have had seven "cities" at the time. This theory, however, seems highly speculative. Ireland (Hibernia) was well-known and appears distinctly on all 15th-century maps.

In a fresh work on the subject, the author Demetrio Charalambous notes that in medieval maps, the name of the island is written Antylia, which is inconsistent with the interpretation commonly accepted that the name means "ante-ilha" in Portuguese. No medieval map records the name "Antilha", by which the author dismisses the name as being Portuguese. Instead, he noted that the first cartographers to mention the island (although they did not represent it) were Francesco and Domenico Pizigano in 1367, who called it Antullia. From this follows that the name means "Anti-Tullia", i.e. Anti-Thule, later transformed into Antyllia, and finally Antillia. According to his interpretation, the name denotes the island opposite to Tyle, but this does not mean it is before Iceland, but beyond it, as represented in the maps. The name means the island opposite to Tyle by sailing southwest, and therefore refers to America.

== Cartographic representation ==
The rediscovery of the Canary Islands by Europeans in the 14th century revived an interest in Atlantic island myths. With the existence of lands out in the Atlantic Ocean confirmed, 14th-century European geographers began plumbing the old legends and plotting and naming many of these mythical islands on their nautical charts, alongside the new discoveries. Mythical Atlantic islands litter the early 14th-century portolan charts of Pietro Vesconte and Angelino Dulcert.

Some historians believe the legend of Antillia was first insinuated cartographically in the 1367 portolan of the Venetian brothers Domenico and Francesco Pizzigano. This was insinuated by an inscription (albeit with no island) on the western edge of the map, which was read by some 19th-century historians as referring to "statues on the shores of Atullia" (ante ripas Atulliae) beyond which sailors should not pass. However, later readings have suggested it should be read as the statues of Arcules (Hercules), and that the inscription's reference is probably to the Pillars of Hercules, the non plus ultra (outer limits) of ancient navigation, and not Antillia.

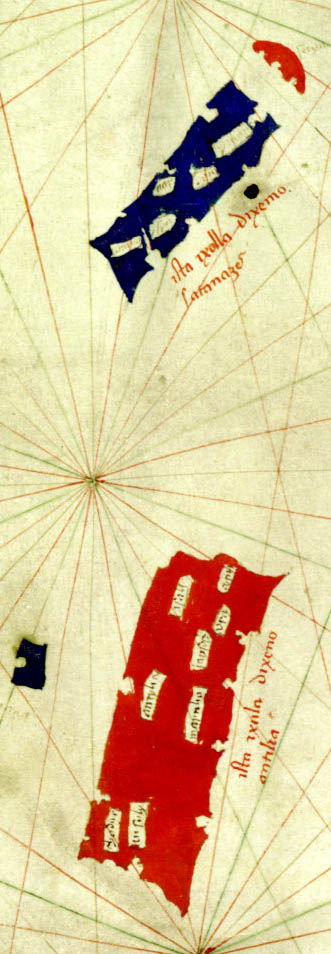
1424 map of Zuane Pizzigano. First clear depiction of Antillia (large red rectangle), Ymana (future Royllo, small blue island to the west), Satanazes (large blue rectangle to the north) and Saya (future Damnar, umbrella-shaped red isle far north)

Antillia makes its first unambiguous appearance in the 1424 portolan chart of Venetian cartographer Zuane Pizzigano, as part of a group of four islands, lying far in the Atlantic Ocean some 250 leagues west of Portugal, and 200 leagues west of the Azores archipelago (which also usually depicted in contemporary charts). Pizzigano drew Antillia as a large, red, rectangular island, indented with bays and dotted with seven settlements, with the inscription ista ixola dixemo antilia ("this island we call antillia", in Venetian). Some sixty leagues north of it is the comparable large blue Satanazes island (ista ixolla dixemo satanazes, called Satanagio/Satanaxio/Salvagio in later maps), capped by a small umbrella-shaped Saya (called "Tanmar" or "Danmar" in later maps). Some twenty leagues west of Antilia is the small blue companion island of Ymana (the 'Royllo' of later maps). These four islands will be collectively drawn together in many later 15th-century maps, with the same relative size, position and shape Pizzigano gave them in 1424. They are commonly referred to collectively as the "Antillia group" or (to use Beccario's label) the insulae de novo rep(er)te ("islands newly reported").

Cartographic appearances of Antillia (in chronological order):

1. 1424 map of Zuane Pizzigano of Venice as ista ixolla dixemo antilia
2. 1435 map of Battista Beccario of Genoa
3. 1436 map of Andrea Bianco of Venice
4. 1455 map of Bartolomeo Pareto of Genoa – omits Satanazes
5. 1463 map of Grazioso Benincasa of Ancona
6. 1463 map of Pedro Roselli of Majorca
7. 1466 map of Pedro Roselli
8. 1468 map of Pedro Roselli
9. 1460s anonymous Weimar map (attrib. to Conte di Ottomano Freducci of Ancona) – labelled as septe civit
10. 1470 map of Grazioso Benincasa
11. c. 1475 map of Cristoforo Soligo of Venice – omits Satanazes, Antillia labelled as y de sete zitade
12. 1474 "map" of Paolo Toscanelli – map missing, but Antilia referenced in letter.
13. 1476 map of Andrea Benincasa of Ancona (son of Grazioso) – omits Satanazes
14. 1480 map of Albino de Canepa of Venice
15. 1482 map of Grazioso Benincasa
16. c. 1482 map of Grazioso Benincasa (different from above)
17. 1482 map of Jacme Bertran of Majorca
18. 1487 map of anonymous Majorcan cartographer
19. 1489 map of Albino de Canepa
20. 1492 Nuremberg globe of Martin Behaim – omits Satanazes, first with inscription relating legend.
21. 1493 anonymous Laon globe
22. c. 1500 Paris map ("Columbus map") of anonymous Portuguese/Genoese (?) cartographer.
23. 1507-08 map of Johannes Ruysch – relocates Satanazes to Isle of Demons(?), relates legend.

As is evident, on some maps (e.g. Pareto, Soligo, Behaim), Antillia appears without Satanazes.

Significantly, although included in his map of 1436, the Antillia group is omitted in the later Andrea Bianco map of 1448, although some authors believe that two rectangular islands depicted by Bianco much further south (in the environs of Cape Verde), and labelled merely dos ermanos ("two brothers") may be a reference to Antilia and Satanazes.

The controversial and possibly fake Vinland map, dated by its supporters around 1440, shows the outlines of Antillia and Satanazes islands (but not the two smaller ones) under the general label Magnae insulae Beati Brandani (great islands of St Brendan).

Antillia (and all its companions) are conspicuously omitted in the map of Gabriel de Vallseca (1439), the Genoese map (1457), the Fra Mauro map (1459) and the maps of Henricus Martellus Germanus (1484, 1489) and Pedro Reinel (c. 1485). With a few exceptions (e.g. Ruysch), Antillia disappears from almost all known maps composed after Christopher Columbus's voyages to the Americas in the 1490s (e.g. it is absent on the 1500 map of Juan de la Cosa, the Cantino planisphere of 1502, etc.)

It appears in virtually all of the known surviving Portolan charts of the Atlantic – notably those of the Genoese B. Beccario or Beccaria (1435), the Venetian Andrea Bianco (1436), and Grazioso Benincasa (1476 and 1482). It is usually accompanied by the smaller and equally legendary islands of Royllo, St Atanagio, and Tanmar, the whole group often classified as insulae de novo repertae, newly discovered islands.

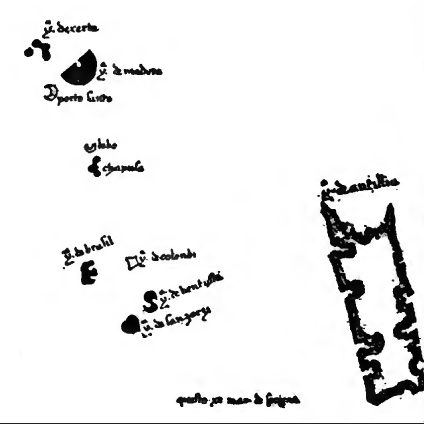
Andea Bianco, 1436. Antillia at right

On these maps, Antillia was typically depicted on a similar scale to that of Portugal, lying around 200 miles west of the Azores. It was drawn as an almost perfect rectangle, its long axis running north–south, but with seven trefoil bays shared between the east and west coasts. Each city lay on a bay. The form of the island occasionally becomes more figurative than the semi-abstract representations of Bartolomeo de Pareto, Benincasa and others: Bianco, for instance, shifts its orientation to northwest–southeast, transmutes generic bays into river mouths (including a large one on the northeastern coast), and elongates a southern tail into a cape with a small cluster of islets offshore.

Around the time of Spain's discovery of South America, Antillia dwindles substantially in size on Behaim's globe and later charts. Contrary to the earlier descriptions of the two island groups as distinct entities, a 16th-century notion relegates Antillia to the island of São Miguel, the largest of the Azores, where a national park centering on two lakes still bears the name Sete Cidades National Park.

== Medieval beliefs and the Age of Discovery ==
A Portuguese legend tells how the island was settled in the early 8th century in the face of the Moorish conquest of Iberia by the Archbishop of Porto, six other bishops and their parishioners to avoid the ensuing Moorish invasion. Each congregation founded a city, namely, Aira, Anhuib, Ansalli, Ansesseli, Ansodi, Ansolli and Con, and once established, burnt their caravel ships as a symbol of their autonomy. The reporting of this settlement comes courtesy of a young couple who eloped back to Europe on a rare trading ship and reported the seven cities as a model of agricultural, economic and cultural harmony. Centuries later, the island became known as a proto-utopian commonwealth, free from the disorders of less favoured states.

Since these events predated the Kingdom of Portugal and the clergy's heritage marked a claim to significant strategical gains, Spain counterclaimed that the expedition was, in fact, theirs. One of the chief early descriptions of the heritage of Antillia is inscribed on the globe which the geographer Martin Behaim made at Nuremberg in 1492. Behaim relates the Catholic escape from the barbarians, though his date of 734 is probably a mistake for 714. The inscription adds that a Spanish vessel sighted the island in 1414, while a Portuguese crew claimed to have landed on Antillia in the 1430s.

In a later version of the legend, the bishops fled from Mérida, Spain, when Moors attacked it around the year 1150.

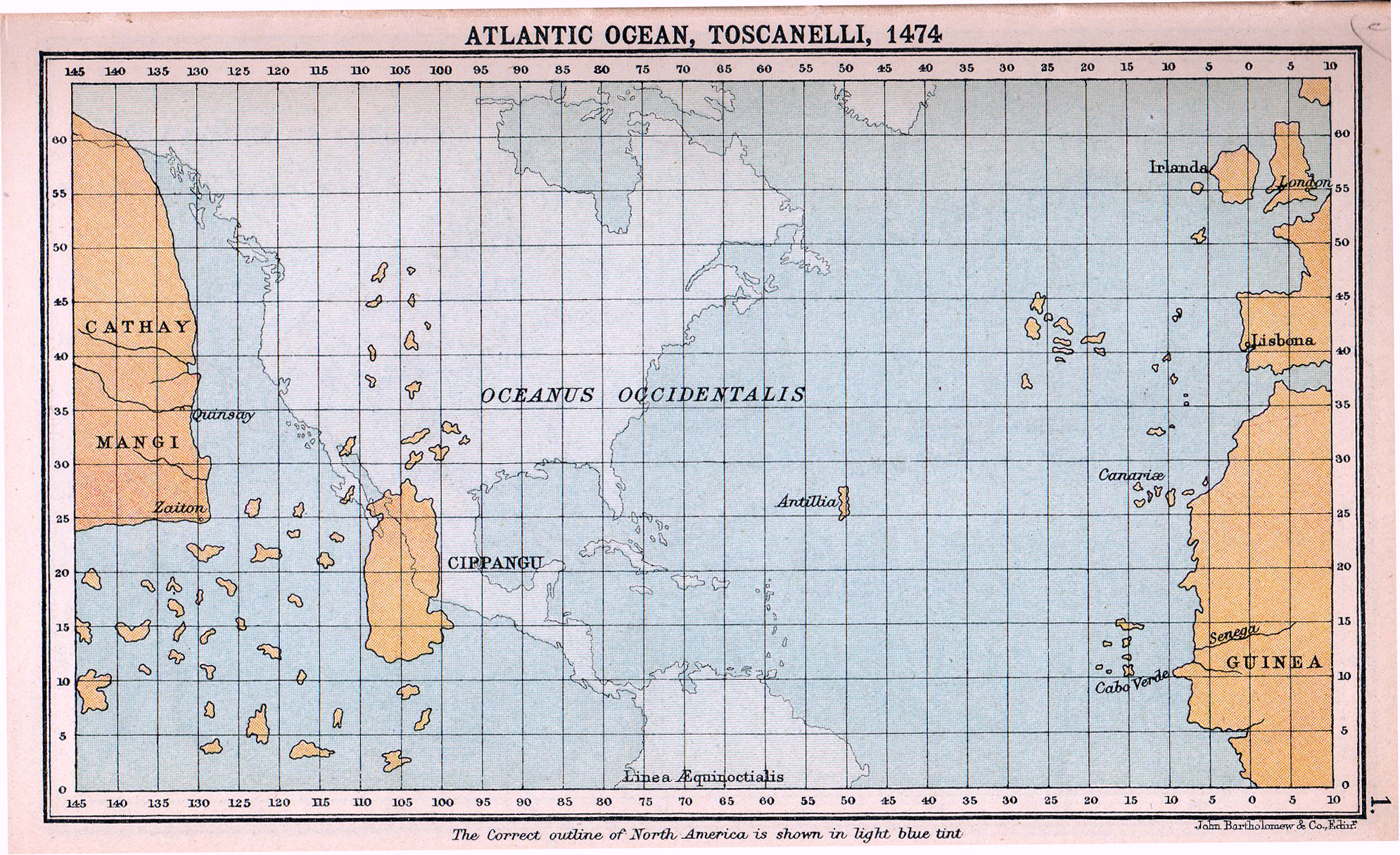
Toscanelli's notions of the geography of the Atlantic Ocean. Antillia at the middle-right.

With this legend underpinning the growing reports of a bountiful civilisation midway between Europe and Cipangu, or Japan, the quest to discover the Seven Cities attracted significant attention. However, by the last decade of the 15th century, the Portuguese state's official sponsorship of such exploratory voyages had ended, and in 1492, under the Spanish flag of Ferdinand and Isabella, Christopher Columbus set out on his historic journey to Asia, citing the island as the perfect halfway house by the authority of Paul Toscanelli. Columbus had supposedly gained charts and descriptions from a Spanish navigator, who had "sojourned ... and died also" at Columbus's home in Madeira, after having made landfall on Antillia.

Following John Cabot's first 1497 voyage to Newfoundland, several people believed he had discovered Antillia. Upon Cabot's return to England, two residents of Bristol – the Italian merchant Raimondo de Soncino (in a letter to the Duke of Milan, dated August 24, 1497) and Bristol merchant John Day (in a letter to Christopher Columbus, written c. December 1497) – refer to Cabot making landfall and coasting the "Island of Seven Cities".

== Later influence ==
Others following d'Anghiera suggested contenders in the West Indies for Antillia's heritage (most often either Puerto Rico or Trinidad), and as a result the Caribbean islands became known as the Antilles. As European explorations continued in the Americas, maps reduced the scale of the island Antillia, tending to place it mid-Atlantic, whereas the Seven Cities of Gold were attributed to mainland Central or North America, as the various European powers vied for territory in the New World.

== See also ==
- Great Ireland (Hvítrmannaland)
- Kantia
- Fonseca Island

== Sources ==
- Babcock, W.H. (1920) "Antillia and the Antilles", Geographical Review, vol. 9 (2), p. 109-24.
- Babcock, W.H. (1922) Legendary islands of the Atlantic: a study in medieval geography New York: American Geographical Society. online
- Barreto, M. (1988) O português Cristóvão Colombo, 1992 trans. as The Portuguese Columbus: secret agent of King John II. New York: Macmillan.
- Beazley, C.R. (1897–1906) The Dawn of Modern Geography. London. vol. 1 (-900), vol.2 (900–1260) vol. 3 (1260–1420)
- Beazley, C. (1899) Raymond "Introduction" in C.R. Beazley and E. Prestage, 1898–99, The Chronicle of the Discovery and Conquest of Guinea, London: Halyut. v.2
- Buache, Jean-Nicholas (1806) "Recherches sur l'île Antillia et sur l'époque de la découverte de l'AmériqueMémoires de l'Institut des Sciences, Lettres et Arts, Vol. 6, Paris: Baudoin, p.1-29
- Columbus, Ferdinand (c. 1539) Historia del Almirante Don Cristobal Colon, en la cual se da particular y verdadera relacion de su vida y de sus hechos, y del descubrimiento de las Indias Occidentales, llamadas Nuevo-Mundo (1892 Madrid edition, 5 volumes)
- Cortesão, Armando (1953) "The North Atlantic Nautical Chart of 1424" Imago Mundi, Vol. 10. JSTOR
- Cortesão, Armando (1954) The Nautical Chart of 1424 and the Early Discovery and Cartographical Representation of America. Coimbra and Minneapolis. (Portuguese trans. "A Carta Nautica de 1424", published in 1975, Esparsos, Coimbra. vol. 3)
- Cortesão, Armando (1970) "Pizzigano's Chart of 1424", Revista da Universidade de Coimbra, Vol. 24 (offprint),
- Crone, G. R. (1938) "The Origin of the Name Antillia", The Geographical Journal, Vol. 91, No. 3 (Mar.), pp. 260–262
- Crone, G.R. (1947) "The Pizigano Chart and the 'Pillars of Hercules'", The Geographical Journal, Apr-Jun, Vol.100, p. 278-9.
- D'Avezac, M.A.P. Marquis (1845) Les îles fantastiques de l'océan occidental au moyen âge: fragment inédit d'une histoire des îles de l'Afrique. Paris: Fain & Thunot. online
- Dickson, Donald R. "The Tessera of Antilia: Utopian Brotherhoods & Secret Societies in the Early Seventeenth Century." Leiden, New York, and Köln: E. J. Brill, 1998
- de Faria e Sousa, Manuel (1628) Epítome de las historias portuguesas: dividido en quatro partes 1677 edition, Brussels: Foppens. online
- Formaleoni, Vicenzio (1783) Saggio sulla Nautica antica de' Veneziani, con una illustrazione d'alcune carte idrografiche antiché della Biblioteca di S. Marco, che dimonstrano l'isole Antille prima della scoperta di Cristoforo Colombo. Venice. online
- Gaffarel, Paul (1882) "L'île des Sept Cités et l'île Antilia", Congresso Internacional de Americanistas, Actas de la Cuara Reunión, Madrid, Madrid: Fortanet, vol. 1, p.198
- Galvão, António (1563) Tratado que compôs o nobre & notauel capitão Antonio Galuão, dos diuersos & desuayrados caminhos, por onde nos tempos passados a pimenta & especearia veyo da India às nossas partes, & assi de todos os descobrimentos antigos & modernos, que são feitos até a era de 1550, Lisbon (trans. R. Hakluyt, 1601, as The Discoveries of the World from Their First Original Unto the Year of Our Lord 1555. 1862 edition, London: Hakluyt online)
- Hassel, George (1822) "America - Einleitung" in Caspari, et al. editors, Vollständiges Handbuch der neuesten Erdbeschreibung, Weimar: Geographischen Instituts. vol. 1 - p.6
- Hennig, R. (1945) "Eine altes Rätsel der Pizigano-Karte gelöst" in Mitteilungen der geographischen Gesellschaft Wien, vol. 88, p. 53-56.
- * Higginson, Thomas Wentworth (1899) Tales of the Enchanted Islands of the Atlantic. New York: Macmillan.online
- von Humboldt, Alexander (1837) Examen critique de l'histoire de la géographie du nouveau continent et des progrès de l'astronomie nautique aux quinzième et seizième siècles, Paris: Gide, vol. II.
- Kretschmer, Konrad (1892) Die Entdeckung Amerika's in ihrer Bedeutung für die Geschichte des Weltbildes. Berlin: Kühl. online
- de Medina, Pedro (1548) Libro de las grandezas y cosas memorables de España. Seville. (1595 edition, Alcala de Henares: Iuan Gracian, online
- Morison, S.E. (1940) Portuguese voyages to America in the fifteenth century Cambridge, Mass: Harvard University Press.
- Morison, S.E. (1955) "Review of Cortesão's 'Nautical Chart of 1424'", Speculum, Vol. 30 (3), p. 467-70.
- Nansen, Fridtjof (1911) In Northern Mists; Arctic exploration in early times. New York: F.A. Stokes. vol. 1, vol. 2
- Nordenskiöld, Adolf Erik (1897) Periplus: An Essay on the Early History of Charts and Sailing Directions, tr. Frances A. Bather, Stockholm: Norstedt.
- O'Curry, Eugene (1861) Lectures on the Manuscript Materials of Ancient Irish History, delivered at the Catholic University of Ireland, during the sessions of 1855 and 1856. Dublin: Duffy. p.289).
- La Ronciere, Charles de (1924) La carte de Cristophe Colomb, Paris: Champion
- Spence, Lewis (1925) The Problem of Atlantis. London: Rider.
- Vignaud, H. (1902) Toscanelli and Columbus: The letter and chart of Toscanelli on the route to the Indies by way of the west, sent in 1474 to the Portuguese, Ferman Martins, and later on to Christopher Columbus; a critical study on the authenticity and value of these documents and the sources of the cosmographical ideas of Columbus, followed by the various texts of the letter. London: Sands. online
- Vignaud, H. (June, 1902) "Did Columbus Discover America?", Everybody's Magazine, June, 1902, Vol. 6, No.6, p.549.
