= Satanazes =

Legendary island

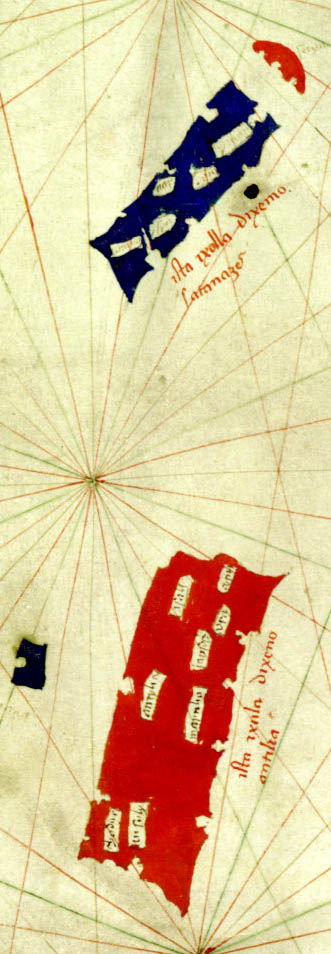
1424 map of Zuane Pizzigano, the first depiction of the island of Satanazes as a large blue rectangular isle north of Antillia.

The island of Satanazes (also called the Island of Devils, or the Hand of Satan) is a legendary island once thought to be located in the Atlantic Ocean, and depicted on many 15th-century maps.

== Cartographic depiction ==
In 15th-century portolan charts, the island of Satanazes is depicted as lying out in the north Atlantic Ocean, due west of the Azores and Portugal, and just north of the legendary island of Antillia.

The island was first depicted in the 1424 portolan chart of Venetian cartographer Zuane Pizzigano. It is drawn as a large, blue rectangular island, indented with bays and five or six settlements, with the inscription ista ixolla dixemo satanazes, which has been translated as "this is the island called of the devils".

In his 1424 chart, Pizzigano placed Satanazes some sixty leagues north of the large Antillia island. Pizzigano capped Satanazes with a little umbrella-shaped island he labels Saya (which later cartographers will call Tanmar or Danmar). These three islands, plus Ymana (later called Royllo, a little companion west of Antillia), would be collectively drawn together in many later 15th-century maps, with the same relative size, position and shape Pizzigano originally gave them, and known collectively as the "Antillia group" or (to use Bianco's label) the insulae de novo rep(er)te ("islands newly reported").

In Grazioso Benincasa's 1463 atlas, the settlements on Satanazes island are named Araialis, Cansillia, Duchal, Jmada, Nam and Saluaga.

Cartographic appearances of Satanazes:

- 1424 map of Zuane Pizzigano of Venice as ista ixolla dixemo satanazes
- 1435 map of Battista Beccario of Genoa as Satanagio
- 1436 map of Andrea Bianco of Venice as Ya de la man satanaxio
- 1463, 1470 and 1482 maps of Grazioso Benincasa of Ancona as Saluaga/Salvaga (u and v are equivalent)
- 1460s anonymous Weimar map (attrib. to Conte di Ottomano Freducci of Ancona) as Salvagio.
- 1480 and 1489 maps of Pedro Roselli of Majorca as Salvatga
- 1480 and 1489 maps of Albino de Canepa of Venice as Salvagia
- 1487 map of anonymous Majorcan cartographer as Salvaja
- 1493 Laon globe as Salirosa

Significantly, the island of Satanazes is omitted on the maps of Bartolomeo Pareto (1455), Cristoforo Soligo (c. 1475) Grazioso's son Andrea Benincasa (1476) and the Nuremberg globe of Martin Behaim (1492), even though they all include Antillia and some retain Saya/Tanmar.

Satanazes disappears on practically all maps after Christopher Columbus's voyages of the 1490s. It was possibly transplanted (in smaller form) to the Isle of Demons, between Newfoundland and Greenland, e.g. the 1508 map of Johannes Ruysch.

== Etymology and legend ==
According to Cortesão, Pizzigano's "Satanazes" is Portuguese for "satans" or "devils", Beccaria's "Satanagio" is the same word in Ligurian dialect and Bianco's "Satanaxio" the same in Venetian. The island disappears from maps after 1436, and reappears only in 1462 when Benincasa switches it to Salvaga, meaning "savage" – possibly a misreading, more probably a deliberate adjustment by Benincasa to avoid using the profanity of "devil". The Laon globe's "Salirosa" is an apparent mis-transcription of "Salvaga".

Historians have conjectured the "Devils" of Satanazes might be a reference to the Skrælings (indigenous peoples of Greenland and Vinland) reported in the Norse sagas, notably the Grœnlendinga saga and the saga of Erik the Red, which began to filter south around this time. Pizzigano may have constructed Satanazes island to capture their rough geographic location.

The possible connection between the Satanazes and the Skrælings was first proposed by Nordenskiöld (1889), his attention drawn by an inscription on some islands between Newfoundland and Greenland in the 1508 map of Johannes Ruysch, which notes how "devils" located there attacked sailors (See Isle of Demons). The connection need not require direct knowledge of the Norse sagas themselves, e.g. Fridtjof Nansen has drawn attention to how Norse encounters with North American "demons" were adopted in Irish immrama. Given the tendency of the legends of Atlantic seafarers – Norse, Irish, Arab and Iberian – to move quickly and cross-fertilize each other, the news of an Isle of Devils out in the North Atlantic may have arrived to Italian cartographers via several channels.

Georg Hassel conjectured that, by their size and shape, the large islands of Satanazes and Antillia may represent the coasts of North America and South America respectively, thus making it a possible testament of pre-Columbian trans-oceanic contact. Babcock conjectures the representation might be of the Caribbean, that Satanazes represents Florida (and Antillia Cuba, Roylla Jamaica and Tanmar the Bahamas).

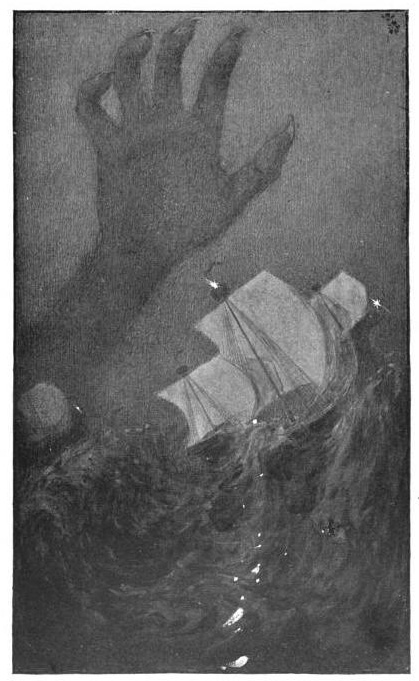
The "Hand of Satan", emerging from the sea to snatch a boat

Andrea Bianco's 1436 long label Ya de la man santanaxio provoked Vicenzo Formaleoni (1783) to read it as the isle of "the Hand of Satan", an alternative name for Satanazes still found in some sources. Formaleoni proposed it might be connected to a legend from India, about a giant hand that arose each day from the sea and carried off the inhabitants into the ocean. This legend is told in the Perigrinaggio di tre giovani (The Three Princes of Serendip) first published in Venice in 1557 by Michele Tramezzino (alleged to be a translation from the Persian of a certain Christopher of Armenia, Christoforo Armeno). The story might have been circulating earlier among Atlantic Ocean seafarers, traced in Irish immrama and Arab tales, about a giant hand in the Sea of Darkness that plucked sailors and sometimes entire boats, and dragged them to the bottom of the ocean. Gaffarel suggests this might be a reference to the icebergs of the North Atlantic Ocean.

The Marquis d'Avezac (1845) launched yet another theory, reading "satanaxio" as S. Atanaxio, i.e. the island of St. Athanasius. D'Avezac also makes the credible argument that the de la man satanaxio in Bianco's label is actually referencing two separate islands, Satanazes and Delaman, probably the nearby Danmar or Tanmar of other maps, believed to be a reference to the legendary Isle of Mam (Babcock proposed an alternate reading of Delaman/Danmar/Tanmar as I la Mar, or "Island of the Sea".)

The discovery of the 1424 Pizzigano map in the 20th century, with its Satanazes clearly indicated, has allowed modern historians to set aside the old Hand of Satan/St. Athanasius theories, and embrace the Isle of Devils reading.

Despite all these conjectures, there is little agreement. Unlike its southern counterpart Antillia (which seems rather solidly connected to the Iberian legend of the Seven Cities), Satanazes has been characterized as a legendary island in need of a legend.

== Sources ==
- Christoforo Armeno (1557) Perigrinaggio di tre giovani figliuoli del re di Serendippo as translated into Italian and published by Michele Tramezzino, Venice. (Eng. trans. as "The Three Princes of Serendip")
- Babcock, W.H. (1922) Legendary islands of the Atlantic: a study in medieval geography New York: American Geographical Society. online
- Buache, Jean-Nicholas (1806) "Recherches sur l'île Antillia et sur l'époque de la découverte de l'AmériqueMémoires de l'Institut des Sciences, Lettres et Arts, Vol. 6, Paris: Baudoin, p.1-29
- Cortesão, Armando (1953) "The North Atlantic Nautical Chart of 1424" Imago Mundi, Vol. 10. JSTOR
- Cortesão, Armando (1954) The Nautical Chart of 1424 and the Early Discovery and Cartographical Representation of America. Coimbra and Minneapolis. (Portuguese trans. "A Carta Nautica de 1424", published in 1975, Esparsos, Coimbra. vol. 3)
- Cortesão, Armando (1970) "Pizzigano's Chart of 1424", Revista da Universidade de Coimbra, Vol. 24 (offprint),
- D'Avezac, M.A.P. Marquis (1845) Les îles fantastiques de l'océan occidental au moyen âge: fragment inédit d'une histoire des îles de l'Afrique. Paris: Fain & Thunot. online
- Formaleoni, Vicenzio (1783) Saggio sulla Nautica antica de' Veneziani, con una illustrazione d'alcune carte idrografiche antiché della Biblioteca di S. Marco, che dimonstrano l'isole Antille prima della scoperta di Cristoforo Colombo. Venice. online
- Gaffarel, Paul (1882) "L'île des Sept Cités et l'île Antilia", Congresso Internacional de Americanistas, Actas de la Cuara Reunión, Madrid, Madrid: Fortanet, vol. 1, p.198
- Georg Hassel (1822) "America – Einleitung" in Caspari, et al. editors, Vollständiges Handbuch der neuesten Erdbeschreibung, Weimar: Geographischen Instituts. vol. 1 – p.6
- Higginson, Thomas Wentworth (1899) Tales of the Enchanted Islands of the Atlantic. New York: Macmillan.online
- Alexander von Humboldt (1837) Examen critique de l'histoire de la géographie du nouveau continent et des progrès de l'astronomie nautique aux quinzième et seizième siècles, Paris: Gide, vol. II.
- Morison, S.E. (1971) The European Discovery of America: The northern voyages, A.D. 500–1600. Oxford University Press.
- Fridtjof Nansen (1911) In Northern Mists; Arctic exploration in early times. New York: F.A. Stokes. vol. 1, vol. 2
- Nordenskiöld, Adolf Erik (1889) Facsimile Atlas to the Early History of Cartography: with reproductions of the most important maps printed in the XV and XVI centuries, Stockholm: Norstedt.
- Nordenskiöld, Adolf Erik (1897) Periplus: An Essay on the Early History of Charts and Sailing Directions, tr. Frances A. Bather, Stockholm: Norstedt.
