= Weimar map =

Historic map of the Western hemisphere

The Weimar map is an anonymous 15th-century Italian portolan chart, held by the Grand Ducal Library of Weimar. Although frequently dated as 1424, most historians believe it was probably composed a half century later. The author is unknown, although said to be a member of the Freducci family of cartographers of Ancona, most probably Conte di Ottomano Freducci. Faint and fragile, the Weimar map is rarely photographed and has been hard to decipher.

== Date and author ==
The exact date and author of the map is contentious. The faint legend has been read (narrowly) as "Contes..........conposuit ancone anno dñi mcccc...". One of the first to examine it, Alexander von Humboldt, tentatively dated the map as early as 1424. However, in subsequent correspondence with the Weimar librarian, Humboldt revised his estimation of the date as late as 1481 or 1491, on account of it containing features that were probably copied from later portolans.

A later examination by Walter Ruge (1904) read the legend more expansively as "Contes he........conposuit ancone anno dñi mcccclx...", with the significant addition of the LX to the date bringing it forward a half century (in Ruge's estimation to the 1470s). Ruge also contended that the "he" and the large space after it is enough to fit hectomanni Fredutijs, thereby proposing its author was the cartographer Conte di Ottomano Freducci of Ancona (fl. 1497–1539), author of the 1497 Wolfenbüttel map. However, Heinrich Winter (1938), one of the few scholars to have had direct access to the fragile map, believes Humboldt's original 1424 date has merit and casts doubt on Ruge's identification of its author, although reserving the possibility that it might have been made by another member of the Freducci family. In his review, Cortesão sides with Ruge and suggests the date of composition was sometime between 1460 and 1469, either by Conte di Ottomano or one of his relatives. More recently, Astengo also says the attribution to Conte di Ottomano "seems reasonable" and that the dating can be anywhere between 1460 and 1499.

== Features ==
The Weimar map is a typical 15th-century Italian portolan chart (Mediterranean and Black Seas) that also covers the Atlantic to the Baltic sea.

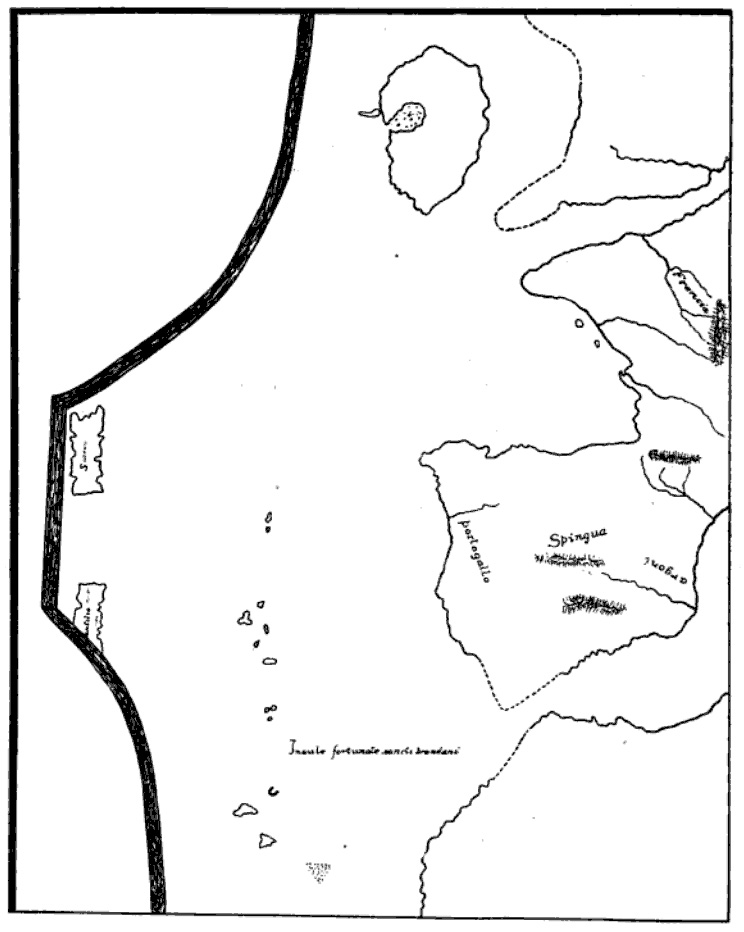
Sketch of Atlantic portion of the Weimar map. (from W.H. Babcock, 1917)

The islands of the Madeira archipelago are depicted and inscribed as INsule fortunate sancti brandani (the mythical islands of Saint Brendan). Islands that seem like the Azores are depicted and named as (corvi) marini, I conilli, San gior(gio), Isola de uentura, colonbi, Isole de bra.ill, chapraria and louo. It is notable that bra.il, presumed to be the mythical Brasil island, is located in this central Atlantic cluster, and not (as is usual in early maps) west of Ireland.

On the extreme left, partially cut off by the narrow neck of the map, is the legendary large Antillia island. Although its lower part is severed, the label Antilia is clear; there are also indications of cities whose faint letters are evocative of Grazioso Benincasa's maps., and a small legend which has been variously read as "Sebil" or, more probably, "Septa" (for the Seven Cities)., Of its companion islands, Satanazes is shown in full (spelled Salvagio here), and there also seems to be a tiny fragment of Royllo and traces of a legend for Tanmar. If the Weimar map were truly made in 1424, then it would be the first map to depict Antillia cartographically (or at least place it on an equal footing with the 1424 nautical map of Zuane Pizzigano).

== See also ==
- Vinland map

== Sources ==
- Astengo, Corradino (2007) "The Renaissance chart tradition in the Mediterranean", in D. Woodward, editor, The History of Cartography, Vol. 3. Cartography in the European Renaissance. Chicago: University of Chicago Press.
- Babcock, W.H. (1917) "Indications of Visits of White Men to America before Columbus", in F.W. Hodge, editor, Proceedings of the Nineteenth International Congress of Americanists, Washington. p.469-78.
- Babcock, W.H. (1922) Legendary islands of the Atlantic: a study in medieval geography New York: American Geographical Society. online
- Caraci, G. (1953) "The Italian Cartographers of the Benincasa and Freducci Families and the So-Called Borgiana Map of the Vatican", Imago Mundi, Vol. 10 (1953), pp. 23–45
- Cortesão, Armando (1954) The Nautical Chart of 1424 and the Early Discovery and Cartographical Representation of America. Coimbra and Minneapolis. (Portuguese trans. "A Carta Nautica de 1424", published in 1975, Esparsos, Coimbra. vol. 3)
- Alexander von Humboldt (1837) Examen critique de l'histoire de la géographie du nouveau continent et des progrès de l'astronomie nautique aux quinzième et seizième siècles, Paris: Gide, vol. II.
- Ruge, W. (1904) "Aelteres kartographisches Material in deutschen Bibliotheken: Erster und zweiter Reseibericht", Nachrichten von der Königl. Gesellschaft der Wissenschafte zu Göttingen: Philologish-historische Klasse, vol.1 Göttingen: Horstmann. online
- Winter, H. (1938) "Notes on the Weimar Portolan" The Geographical Journal, Vol. 92 (2), p. 150-52.
