= Battista Beccario =

15th-century Genoese cartographer

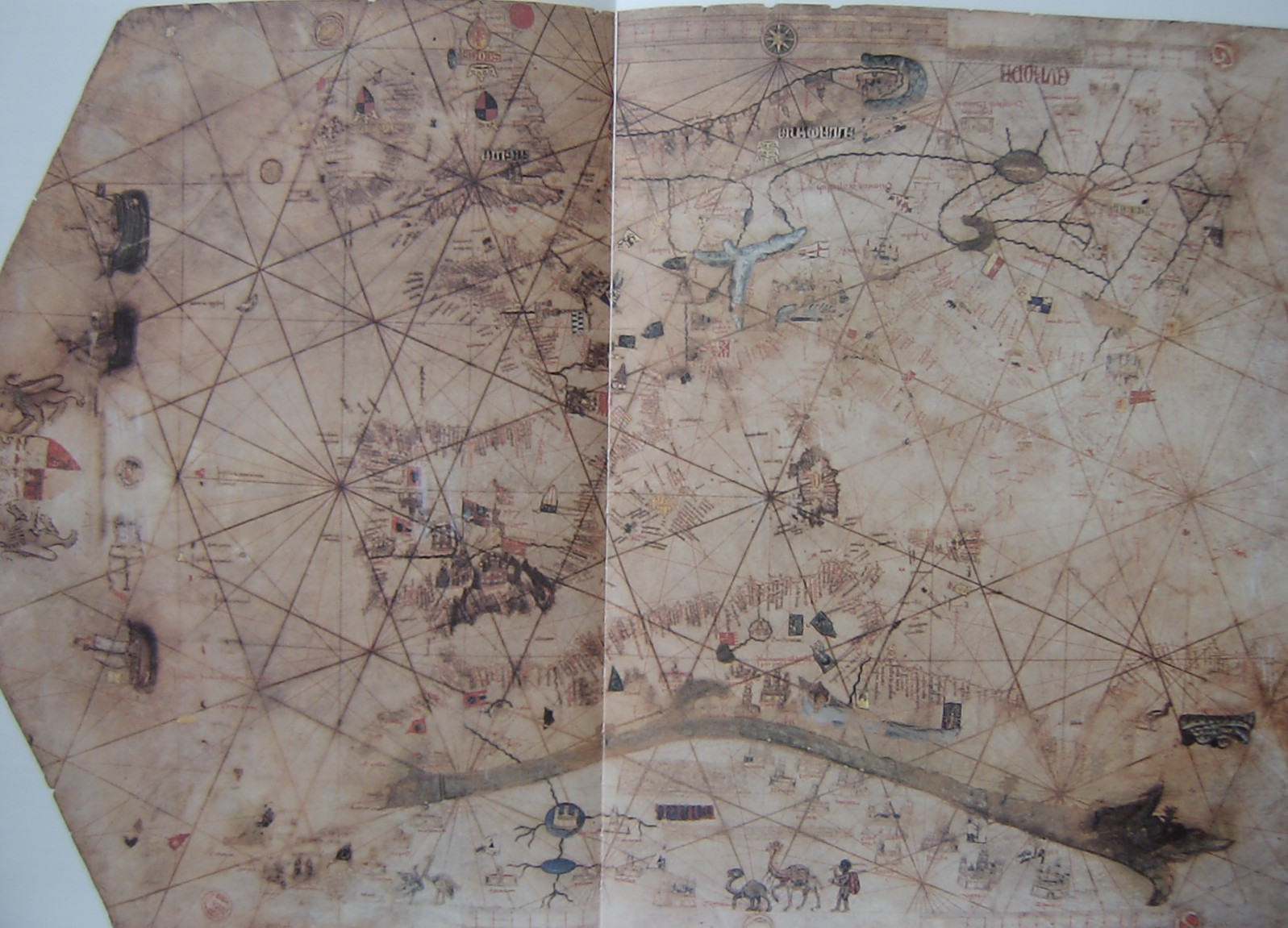
1426 portolan of Battista Beccario

Battista Beccario, also known as Baptista Beccharius (name also sometimes given as "Beccaria", "Beccari" or "Bedrazio"), was a 15th-century Genoese cartographer.

Virtually nothing is known of his life. Battista is probably a relative (perhaps a son?) of an earlier Genoese cartographer, Francesco Beccario, responsible for a 1403 portolan map.

Battista Beccario is the author of two notable portolan charts:

- 1426 portolan chart, signed and dated, "Baptista Becharius civis Janue composuit hanc cartam anno domini millex.o CCCC.XXX de mense novembris ad requisicionem et nomine...." (rest illegible), 103.5 x 68 cm, held by the Bayerische Staatsbibliothek in Munich, Germany.(Mapp.XXV,1y)
- 1435 portolan chart signed and dated as "....a becharius. Ciuis Janue composiut hanc ....anno domini. Millexio cccc.xxxv de....jullij" (some portions unreadable), 89 x 65 cm, held by the Biblioteca Palatina in Parma, Italy. (II,21,1613)

(A third possible Battista Beccario map surfaced c.1950, albeit unsigned and tentatively dated c.1426. It is privately held.)

Both of the Beccario maps are smaller than the "normal portolan", i.e. they omit the Black Sea and most of the east Mediterranean. The maps also barely touches Europe north of Flanders. They do, however, have an expansive Atlantic Ocean, riddled with islands.

In the 1426 Munich map, Beccario seems to derive many of the stylings of the Majorcan cartographic school, being the first Italian map replete with inland features Although it seems like a "normal portolan", it covers an area a bit smaller than its predecessors, e.g. it omits most of northern Europe and the Baltics, and less of the west African coast. Among its novel features, Beccario depicts the winds and the Pole star on colored round disks on the edge of the map, a custom later widely adopted in portolan charts. The portolan's signature is emblazoned with the royal arms of Castile-Leon, suggesting a Spanish patron.

Beccario's 1435 Parma map is similar to the earlier in its range, but exhibits the traditional sparse Italian school style, nautical-focused, omitting most inland details and illustrations, with only a few cities depicted (Genoa, Avignon, Santiago de Compostela, Tlemcen), the rest (if noted) reduced to labels.

In his 1426 map, Beccario labels what seems like the Madeira archipelago, recently (re-?)discovered by the Portuguese in 1418–20, as the insulle fortunate santi brandany ("Fortunate Islands of Saint Brendan"), blending the legendary Saint Brendan's Island and the real islands of Madeira.

Prior to the discovery of the 1424 map of Zuane Pizzigano, Beccario's 1435 Parma map was believed to be the first to depict the legendary Atlantic islands of Antillia, Satanazes (Satanagio), Royllo and Tanmar, famously labelling the group as Insulle a nove repte (read: repte = repertae, "islands newly reported"). The Antillia group does not appear in his earlier 1426 chart.

== Sources ==
- Babcock, W.H. (1919) "St. Brendan's Explorations and Islands", Geographic Review, Vol. 8 p.37
- Babcock, W.H. (1922) Legendary islands of the Atlantic: a study in medieval geography New York: American Geographical Society. online
- Campbell, T. (2011) "Census of pre-sixteenth-century portolan charts" at maphistory.info, last visited June 16, 2011
- Cortesão, Armando (1954) The Nautical Chart of 1424 and the Early Discovery and Cartographical Representation of America. Coimbra and Minneapolis. (Portuguese trans. "A Carta Nautica de 1424", published in 1975, Esparsos, Coimbra. vol. 3)
- Desimoni, Cornelio (1875) Elenco di carte ed atlanti nautici di autore genovese oppure in Genova fatti o conservati, Giornale Ligustico, Vol. 2, p.41–71.
- Alexander von Humboldt (1837) Examen critique de l'histoire de la géographie du nouveau continent et des progrès de l'astronomie nautique aux quinzième et seizième siècles, Paris: Gide, vol. II.
- Longhena, M. (1907) "Atlanti e Carte Nautiche del Secolo XIV al XVII, conservati nella biblioteca e nell'archivio di Parma", Archivio Storico per le Provincie Parmensi, Vol. VII. offprint
- Revelli, P. (1951) "Una nuova carta di Batista Beccari ('Batista Becharius')?", Bollettino della Società Geografica Italiana, vol. 88, p. 156-66.
- Uzielli, G. and P. Amat di S. Filippo (1882) Studi biografici e bibliografici sulla storia della geografia in Italia, Vol. 2 - Mappamondi, carte nautiche, portolani ed altri monumenti cartografici specialmente italiani dei secoli XIII-XVII, Rome: Società geografica italiana, 2nd ed., Vol. 2
- Winter, Heinrich (1952) "Petrus Roselli", Imago Mundi, Vol. 9, p. 1-11
