= Kantia =

Kantia is the name of a phantom island in the Caribbean that Johann Otto Polter, a German merchant from Leipzig, claimed to have seen in 1884. He described its position as "at the 14th circle of latitude below the Tropic of Cancer". He named the island after the philosopher Immanuel Kant. In four subsequent expeditions between 1884 and 1909, he failed to rediscover the island to proclaim it for the German emperor.

According to the German sociologist Wulf D. Hund, the story of Kantia is a mere fictional account conceived by Samuel Herzog.

== See also ==
- Fonseca Island
- Antillia
