= Domenico and Francesco Pizzigano =

14th-century Venetian cartographers

Domenico and Francesco Pizzigano, known as the Pizzigani brothers, were 14th-century Venetian cartographers. Their surname is sometimes given as Pizigano (only one 'z') in older sources.

== 1367 chart ==
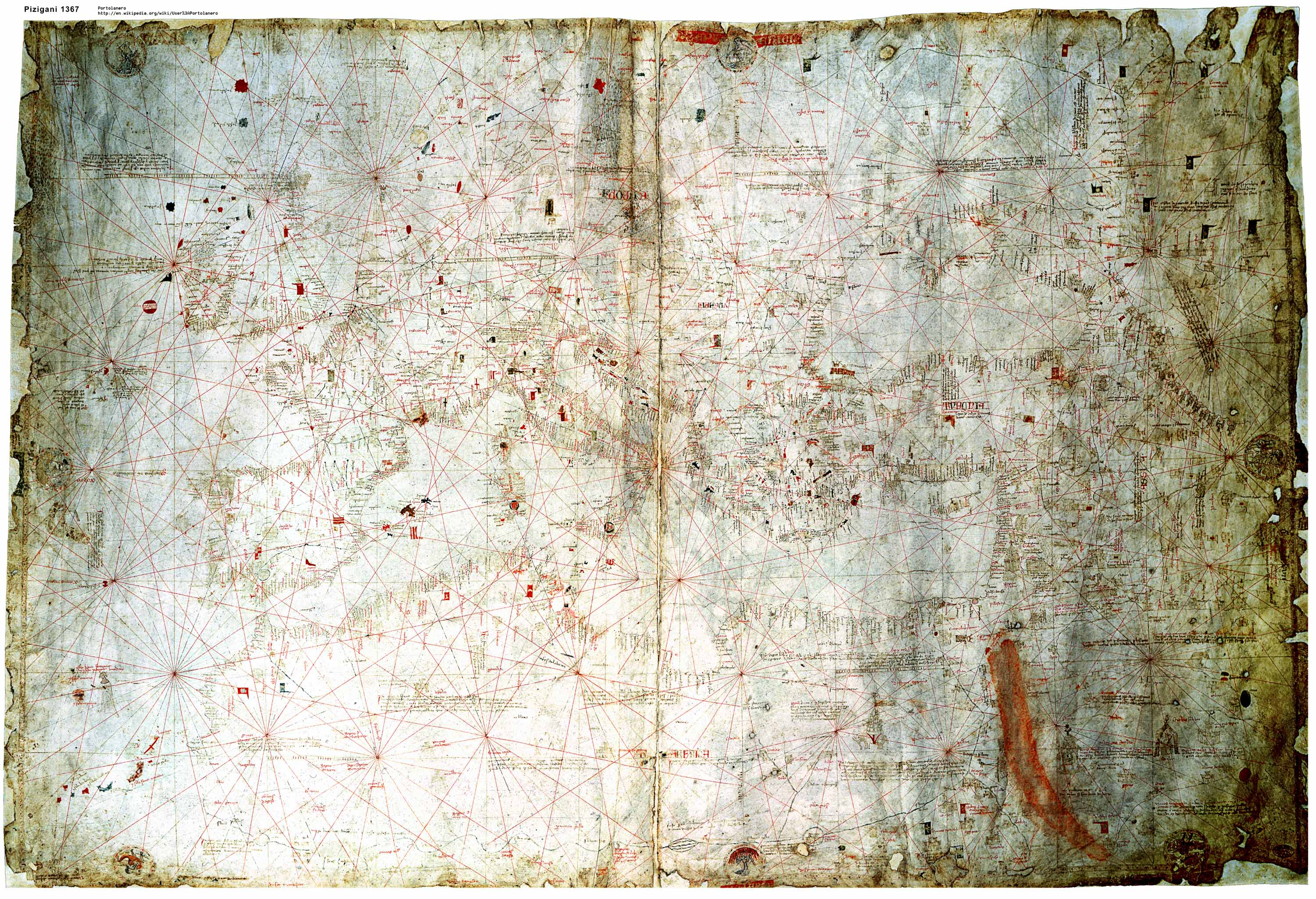
The 1367 chart of the Pizzigani brothers. (Full 10 MB Version)

The Pizzigani brothers are principally known for the construction of a portolan chart, signed and dated 1367, currently held by the Biblioteca Palatina of Parma (Ms.Parm.1612). Measuring 138 by 92 cm, it is one of the largest maps of that era.

There is some controversy over the authorship. The note on the edge of the map, states (in one reading): ""MCCCLXVII. Hoc opus compoxuid franciscus pizigano veneciar et domnus pizigano In Venexia meffecit marcus die XII decembris.". The common assumption is that this refers to two brothers, Francesco Pizzigano and Domenico Pizzigano. Among the various alternative hypothesis is that Francesco was the son of Domenico, rather than his brother (and that Domenico might be dead by this date); that 'domnus' is a title for a priest, that the proper first name of the second author is Marco, that a close reading of the authorship note seems more like 'rardus' – or (Ge)rardus, Gerardo; that there might be three brothers (Francesco, Domenico, Marco/Gerardo), etc. It was customary to refer to the brothers as the Pizigani (one z), until the discovery of the 1424 map of Zuane Pizzigano in the 20th century suggested a re-spelling to a double z.

The Pizzigani portolan of 1367 is notable for going beyond the normal geographical boundaries of contemporary maps (Mediterranean and Black Seas) to include large swathes of the Atlantic Ocean, the northerly Scandinavian peninsula and the Baltic and Caspian Seas.

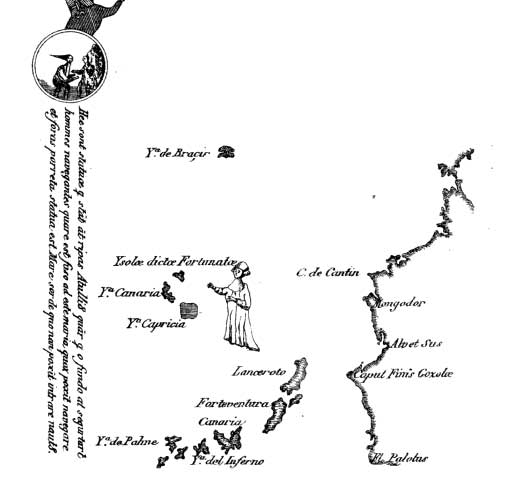
Atlantic islands off coast of Africa in 1367 map

The 1367 Pizzigani chart gives an expanded depiction of the Canary Islands, showing eight of them, reflecting the knowledge accumulated since the 1339 Angelino Dulcert chart. It also includes the fantasy islands of Brasil (in the open ocean, with ships and dragons of Arab legend depicted around it). North of the real Canaries, the Pizzigani brothers also depicted a fictional cluster of Fortunate Islands, intended to capture Saint Brendan's Island, graced by an image of Brendan himself in monastic garb. The Pizzigani map is also the first in which the mythical Isle of Mam (southwest of Ireland) makes its first appearance.

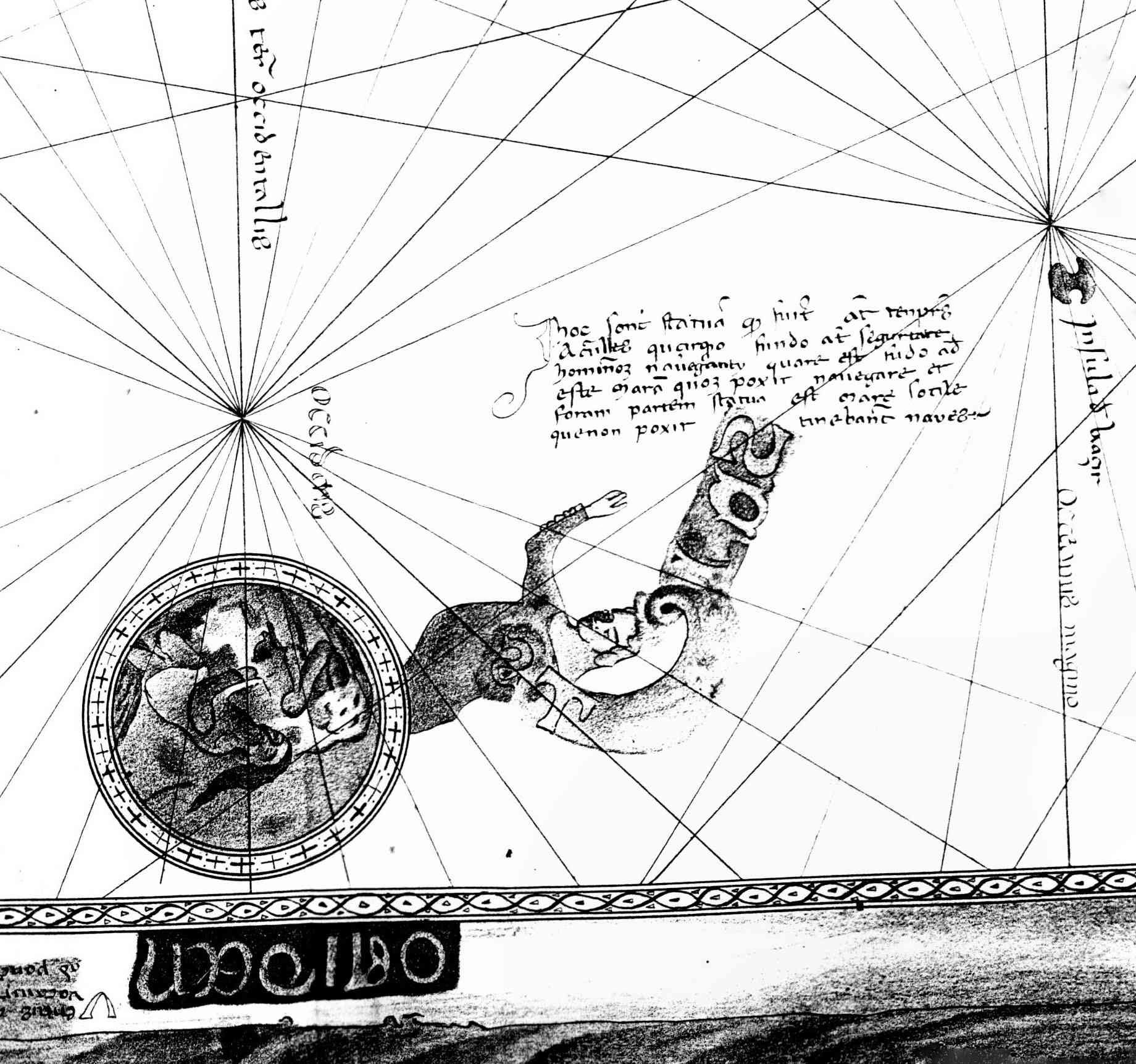
Inscription of Antillia/Hercules in 1367 map.

Some historians once believed the legendary island of Antillia, made famous in many 15th-century portolan charts, was first insinuated cartographically in the 1367 Pizigani brothers chart. On the western edge of the map, although there is no island depicted or mentioned, there is a disk with a picture of a man with hand outstretched, and an inscription, which some have read as saying "Here are statues which stand before the shores of Atullia (ante ripas Atulliae) and which have been set up for the safety of sailors; for beyond is the vile sea, which sailors cannot navigate". Some scholars, especially in the 19th century, believed this Atullia was the first reference to "Antillia" on a map (e.g. Buache, Kretschmer, Nordenskiöld) but this reading has been doubted since. Crone (1938) read it as ante ripas Getuliae (Getulia). Beginning with Hennig (1945), the inscription has been commonly read as at temps Arcules or ante templum Arcules (from the time/temple of Hercules)., almost doubtlessly a reference to the Pillars of Hercules, the non-plus ultra of ancient navigation, as transmitted via Arab sources, e.g. al-Masudi speaks of the "copper idols" of "King Hercules the Giant" marking the edge of the Green Sea of Darkness, al-Idrisi places the marker 'idols' on islands away from the straits.

The 1367 map also provides one of the first clear European depictions of the legendary "River of Gold" in west Africa. This is the "western Nile" described by Arabic sources, notably the geographers al-Bakri and al-Idrisi. The western Nile is essentially the Senegal River and the Niger River, which were long assumed to be connected to each other, flowing through the gold-producing heart of the Mali Empire. The Pizzigani brothers called it the "Palolus" river, and place its source at a large lake in the "Mountains of the Moon" in the east (from which the Egyptian Nile was also believed to stem). The Pizzigani show the river running west, pouring into the Atlantic Ocean somewhere south of "Caput finis Gozola" (Cape Non). The Pizzigani brothers place the actual gold mines on a river island which they call the "island of Palola" (probably the Buré gold district, which surrounded by branches of the upper Niger River, was mistaken for a river island).

The Pizzigani map also makes note of the legend of Prester John, noting that so much gold was found there, that it was even used to tile the roofs of houses and forge the weapons of his soldiers.

== Other charts ==
In addition to the 1367 chart (Biblioteca Palatina, Parma, Ms.Parm.1612), the Pizzigani brothers are believed to be responsible for four other maps:

- (Domenico Pizzigano alone): small map of Palestine and Syria, dated 1350, facsimile held by the Bibliothèque nationale de France in Paris (Ge F 2428).
- (Francesco Pizzigano alone): portolan chart of the Mediterranean, dated 1373, held by the Biblioteca Ambrosiana in Milan (SP10,29).
- (attributed to Pizzigani): an anonymous and undated portolan chart (c. 1375–1400) held by the Biblioteca Civica Correr in Venice.
- (possibly Pizzigani): an anonymous fragment of a chart (East Mediterranean only) that was part of the private collection of Youssoff Kamal, now held by Dar al-Kutub in Cairo.

Venetian cartographer Zuane Pizzigano, responsible for a famous 1424 portolan chart, containing the first unambiguous depiction of Antillia, is believed to be related to Domenico and Francesco Pizzigano (possibly a son of one of them).

== Sources ==
- Astengo, Corradino (2007) "The Renaissance chart tradition in the Mediterranean", in D. Woodward, editor, The History of Cartography, Vol. 3. Cartography in the European Renaissance. Chicago: University of Chicago Press.
- Beazley, C.R. (1897) The Dawn of Modern Geography. London. vol. 1
- Buache, Jean-Nicholas (1806) "Recherches sur l'île Antillia et sur l'époque de la découverte de l'AmériqueMémoires de l'Institut des Sciences, Lettres et Arts, Vol. 6, Paris: Baudoin, p.1-29
- Campbell, T. (2011a) "Census of pre-sixteenth-century portolan charts: Corrections and updates" ( online, accessed 7 July 2011)
- Campbell, T. (2011b) "Anonymous works and the question of their attribution to individual chartmakers or to their supposed workshops" (online, accessed 7 July 2011)
- Cortesão, Armando (1953) "The North Atlantic Nautical Chart of 1424" Imago Mundi, Vol. 10. JSTOR
- Cortesão, Armando (1954) The Nautical Chart of 1424 and the Early Discovery and Cartographical Representation of America. Coimbra and Minneapolis. (Portuguese trans. "A Carta Nautica de 1424", published in 1975, Esparsos, Coimbra. vol. 3)
- Crone, C.R. (1937) "The Bianco Chart, 1448, and the 'Pillars of Hercules'", The Geographical Journal, Vol. 89 (5), pp. 485–87.
- Crone, G. R. (1938) "The Origin of the Name Antillia", The Geographical Journal, Vol. 91, No. 3 (Mar.), pp. 260–262
- Crone, G.R. (1947) "The Pizigano Chart and the 'Pillars of Hercules'", The Geographical Journal, Apr–Jun, Vol.100, pp. 278–9.
- Fischer, Theobald (1886) Sammlung mittelalterlicher Welt- und Seekarten italienischen Ursprungsund aus italienischen Bibliotheken und Archiven Venice: F. Ongania. online
- Hennig, R. (1945) "Eine altes Rätsel der Pizigano-Karte gelöst" in Mitteilungen der geographischen Gesellschaft Wien, vol. 88, pp. 53–56.
- Kretschmer, Konrad (1892) Die Entdeckung Amerika's in ihrer Bedeutung für die Geschichte des Weltbildes. Berlin: Kühl. online
- Longhena, M. (1907) "Atlanti e Carte Nautiche del Secolo XIV al XVII, conservati nella biblioteca e nell'archivio di Parma", Archivio Storico per le Provincie Parmensi, Vol. VII. offprint
- Longhena, M. (1927) "La carta dei Fratelli Pizigano della Biblioteca Palatina di Parma", Atti del X Congresso Geographico Italino, Milan.
- Major, R.H. (1868) The Life of Prince Henry, surnamed the Navigator. London: Asher & Co
- Nordenskiöld, Adolf Erik (1897) Periplus: An Essay on the Early History of Charts and Sailing Directions, tr. Frances A. Bather, Stockholm: Norstedt.
- Russell, Peter E. (2000) Prince Henry 'the Navigator': a life. New Haven, Conn: Yale University Press.
