= Isle of Demons =

Phantom island in Newfoundland

- Johannes Ruysch's 1508 Map location
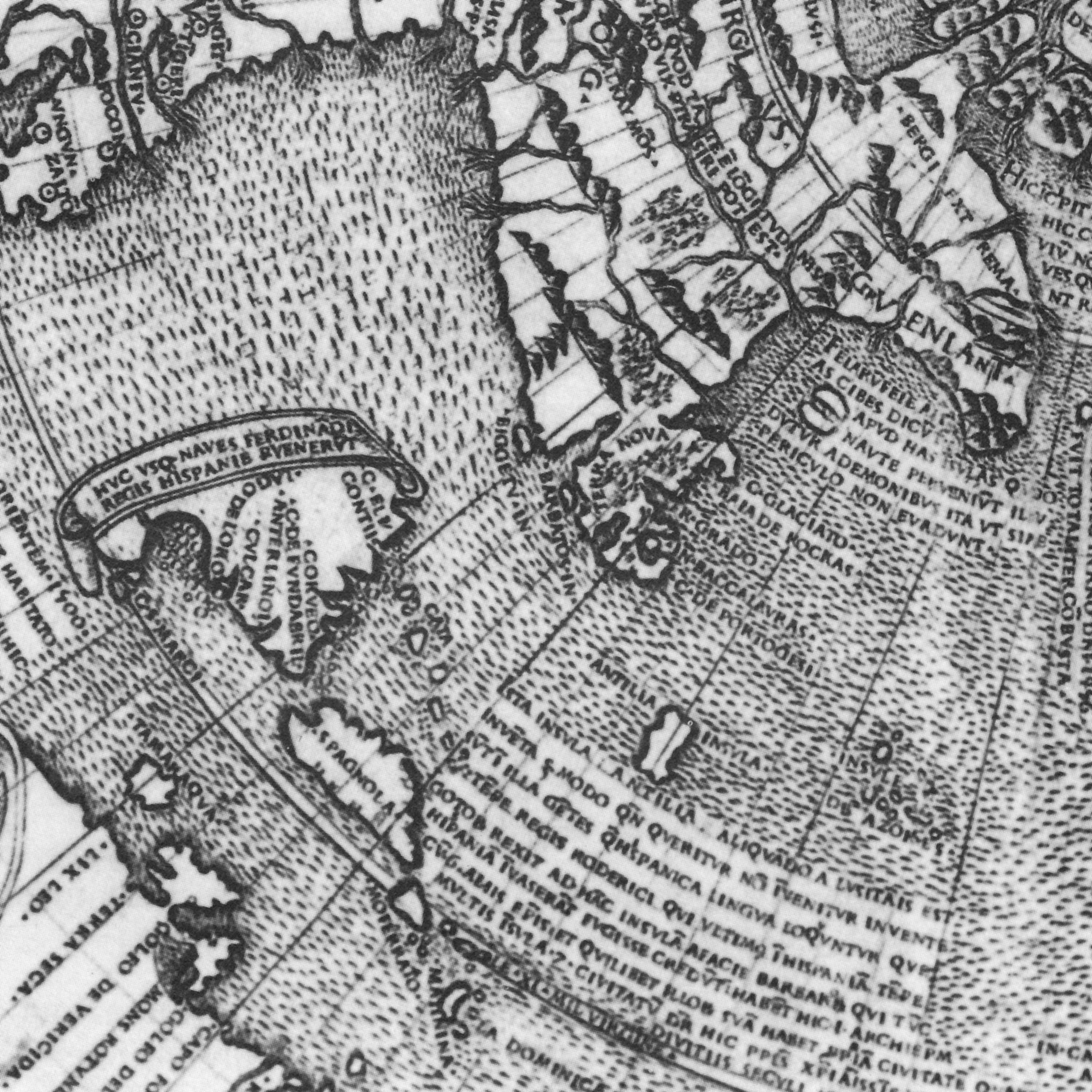
- Inscription of the Isle of Demons off Newfoundland in the map. Notice Antillia further south.

In-universe information
- Type: Phantom island

The Isle of Demons is a phantom island that was allegedly located somewhere off the island of Newfoundland, in Canada. It was generally shown as two islands. It began appearing on maps during the early 16th century and disappeared from maps during the mid-17th century. Although the island is likely fictional, it is sometimes identified with various islands in the region, including Belle Isle, Quirpon Island and Harrington Harbour.

It was said by some that the island was populated by demons and wild beasts which would torment and attack any ships that passed or anyone who was foolish enough to wander onto the island. It could have been a translation from First Nations people who often avoided areas where a person had died, believing it was haunted by spirits.

The Isle of Demons first appears in the 1508 map of Johannes Ruysch. It may simply be a relocated version of the older legendary island of Satanazes ("Devils" in Portuguese) that was normally depicted in 15th century maps in the middle of the Atlantic Ocean just north of Antillia. With the Atlantic better mapped with the trans-oceanic voyages of the 1490s, Ruysch may simply have transplanted old Satanazes to a more suitable location.

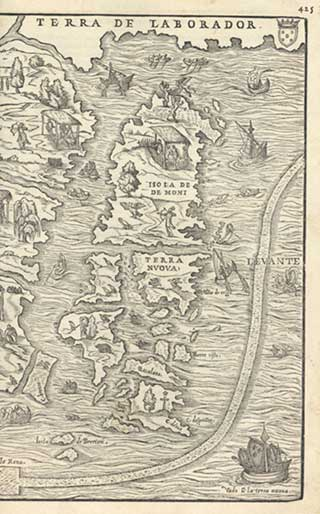
The "Isola de Demoni", in the 1556 printed map of Giacomo Gastaldi.

The Isle of Demons continues to appear as late as the 1556 map of "La Nueva Francia" by Giacomo Gastaldi – that is, after Jacques Cartier's expeditions (1534, 1535, 1541) had explored much of Newfoundland and the Gulf of St. Lawrence. The "Isola de Demoni" is depicted by Gastaldi as a substantially large island roughly encompassing northern Newfoundland, with figurative depictions of flying demons.

== Marooning of de la Rocque ==
A French noblewoman, Marguerite de La Rocque, was marooned on an island during the mid-16th century, allegedly because of an affair with a young man on her ship. This island is a possible site of their abandonment, and residents and visitors have claimed to see the couple. Many historians, novelists, poets, and singers have retold the story of Marguerite abandoned on the island. It is believed that the island of the marooning is possibly Harrington Harbour, Quebec. The idea that the island on which Marguerite de La Rocque was abandoned in 1542 by her relative Jean-François Roberval was the Isle of Demons comes from André Thevet, who recounts it in his Cosmographie universelle published in 1575.

However, according to some researchers, Thevet may have placed Marguerite's drama on the Isle of Demons solely to make the story more sensational by adding fantastical elements. Indeed, there were geographers before him who differentiated between the two islands. This is the case of Gerardus Mercator, who, in 1569, clearly marked the two islands on his world map: the “Île de la Demoiselle” in the Gulf of St. Lawrence at the mouth of the present-day St. Paul River, and the Isle of Demons off the coast of Newfoundland.

In a French book entitled L'île aux démons (Isle of Demons), Canadian map curator Alban Berson showed that, shortly before his death, in an unpublished manuscript entitled Grand insulaire held at the Bibliothèque nationale de France, Thevet recanted his statements. He renamed the island where Marguerite was abandoned “Île de Roberval” and explained that the young woman, terrified by her situation, had suffered hallucinations on an island that was in fact welcoming.
