= Zuane Pizzigano =

15th-century Venetian cartographer

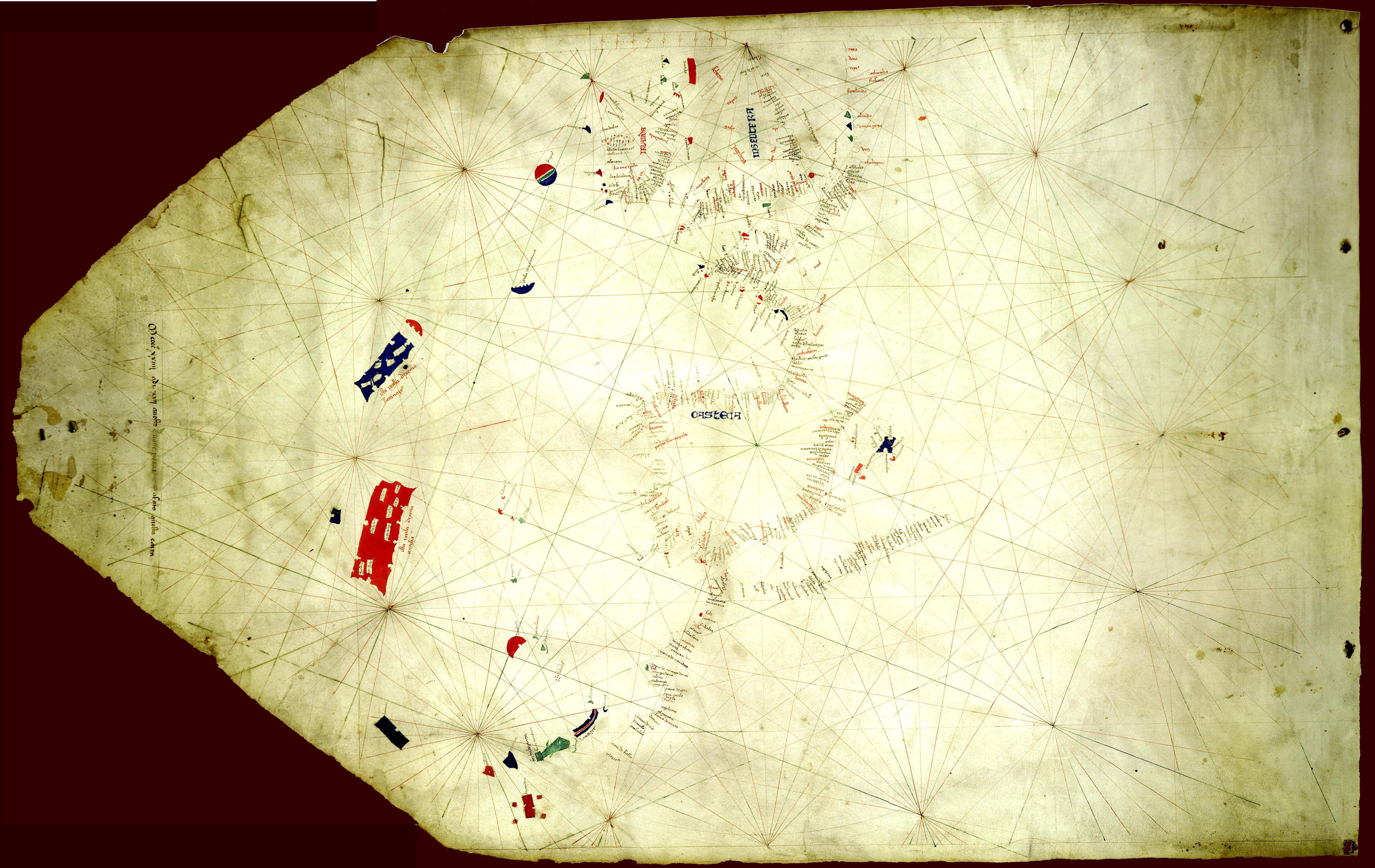
Portolan chart of Zuane Pizzigano, 1424

Zuane Pizzigano (sometimes given as Giovanni Pizzigano), was a 15th-century Venetian cartographer. He is the author of a famous 1424 portolan chart, the first known to depict the phantom islands of the purported Antillia archipelago (Antillia, Satanazes, Royllo and Tanmar), in the north Atlantic Ocean.

== Background ==
Little is known of Zuane Pizzigano, save that he was probably a relative (possibly a descendant) of the Venetian cartographers Domenico and Francesco Pizzigano, who made a famous 1367 portolan chart.

== 1424 chart ==
Zuane Pizzigano is the author of the influential 1424 portolan chart, known simply as the "Pizzigano Map", measuring 57 by 90 cm (22 by 35 in). The map was first discovered in 1953, among the thousands of manuscripts in the library of the noted collector Sir Thomas Phillipps. It is currently held by the James Ford Bell Library at the University of Minnesota in Minneapolis, USA. (B1424mPi)

Identification of the author is not certain. The legend on the 1424 map reads: Mccccxxiiij adi xxij auosto Zuane pizzi..... afato questa carta ("1424 on 22 August, Zuane Pizzi..... made this map"), with the part after the last name "Pizzi" smudged, seemingly tracing an attempt to erase and then restore the author's name. The smudged space, under infrared light, does seem to reveal something like "pizzigano". Zuane is a common Venetian variant of Giovanni (John). While his name is uncertain, the date is not. Comparison with later maps of the 15th century shows that other cartographers had copied Pizzigano in several important respects, so his work was significant.

=== Features ===
The 1424 Pizzigano map is a nautical portolan chart that is limited to western Europe, northwest Africa, and a large swathe of the north Atlantic Ocean. He featured both real and mythical islands in the outer area. The map has notes in Venetian and Portuguese.

Although the drawing is rudimentary, the Canary Islands are depicted near completeness, with eight known islands indicated—alegranzia (Alegranza), larozio (Roque del Este), lancarot (blue with red stripe, rather than the usual Genoese shield, an understandable variation for a Venetian author), louos (Lobos Island), fortubentura/fortouentura (Fuerteventura), canaria (Gran Canaria), inferno (Tenerife), and a long distance to the west, balmar (La Palma). It is significantly missing La Gomera and El Hierro (which had already been shown in earlier maps). Pizzigano indicates a mysterious large red island, with four outlying islets, to the south of the Canaries archipelago, which he identifies as himadoro. This may represent the mythical Saint Brendan's Island.

The Madeira Islands, officially recently discovered in 1418–1420 by the Portuguese, are also depicted, with the names accurately given: madera (Madeira), portosanto (Porto Santo, dexrexta (Desertas) and saluazes (Savage Islands). This showed that the results of exploration were being rapidly shared among the seagoing nations and their cartographers.

More surprising is Pizzigano's depiction of what appears to be the Azores archipelago further north, as these islands were not officially discovered by the Portuguese until 1431 or possibly 1427 at the earliest. Earlier maps had also sometimes featured such Atlantic islands (e.g. the Catalan Atlas of 1375), with names partially taken from ancient European sources. According to Cortesão's tentative 20th-century identification, in the 1424 Pizzigano map, these islands are denoted as the following: lubrioczo (São Jorge), ixola de uentula (Faial), ixo de braxil (Terceira), capiria (São Miguel) and louo (Santa Maria).

=== Antillia group ===
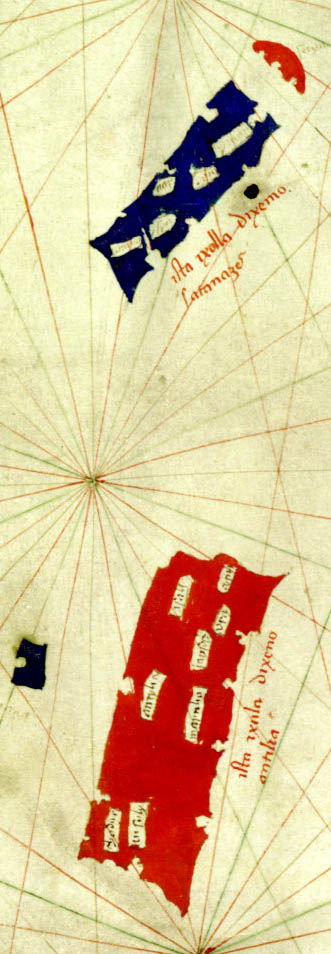
The mythical Antillia island group, as depicted by Zuane Pizzigano, 1424

The most famous islands of the 1424 Pizzigano map are the Antillia group of four islands in the middle of Atlantic Ocean, west of the putative Azores, because he was the first known cartographer to depict them. The group is dominated by two very large rectangular-shaped islands: the large red Antilia (in Pizzigano's label, ista ixolla dixeno antilia) and, some sixty leagues north of it, the large blue Satanazes (ista ixolla dixemo satanazes, the Satanaxio/Satanagio/Salvagio of later maps). Some twenty leagues west of the great Antilia is the small blue Ymana (the 'Royllo' of later maps), while the Santanazes is capped to the north by the semi-circular red Saya (the 'Tanmar' or 'Danmar' of later maps).

Historians have speculated that Pizzigano's depiction of the Antilia group on his 1424 map is based on accounts of possible pre-Columbian trans-oceanic contact with the Americas, but the basis of his depiction is not known for certain. For a time, historians thought he may have based the island group on a suggestive inscription in the 1367 map of the Pizzigani brothers (his relatives, possibly his father), but that interpretation has since been discarded. It is largely agreed that Zuane Pizzigano is the first known cartographer to depict the legendary Antilia group on a map.

The name of the main island, Antillia, is believed to be derived from the Portuguese term ante-ilha ("opposite island", that is, facing Portugal). It is derived from an old Iberian legend, relating how seven Visigothic bishops, fleeing the Muslim conquest of Hispania in 714, embarked with their flock on ships and fled across the Atlantic to erect a new home on this island. Pizzigano, as many others after him, attempted to depict and name the seven settlements on the island; thus it is also known as the "island of Seven Cities".

The source of Satanazes (the "Isle of Devils" in Portuguese), to the north of Antillia, is more uncertain. This island may represent elements of the Norse sagas of Greenland and Vinland, which had begun to filter south around this time; the indigenous Skrælings in these accounts would be the 'devils' implied in the island's name. The Ymana to the west of Antilia is possibly a transcription of Ynsula Mam, the legendary Isle of Mam, first depicted in 1367 by the Pizzigani brothers. 'Saya' is more obscure.

Whatever his source, Zuane Pizzigano mapped the Antillia group of islands; his number of islands, sizes, shapes and positions, were all subsequently copied almost exactly by most cartographers during the 15th century—notably, Battista Beccario (1435), Andrea Bianco (1436), Grazioso Benincasa (1462, 1470, 1482), etc. down to the 1492 Erdapfel globe of Martin Behaim.

Pizzigano's 1424 map includes two other legendary islands: the tri-colored circular island of braxil, located just west of Ireland, is believed to represent the mythical Brasil, which had already been shown in earlier maps. Southwest of that, around half-way to the Antilia group, lies a semi-circular blue island denoted ixola de uentura. It is located near the area where the Pizzigani brothers first depicted the legendary Isle of Mam in 1367, and it may have been Z. Pizzigano's intention to duplicate that. However, identifying uentura with Mam would leave Ymana unresolved. One possibility is that the ixola de ventura is related to the Illa Verde ("Green Island", a reference to Greenland). Filtered from Norse or Irish sources, this was sometimes represented on contemporary maps, and perhaps was already known to Iberian fishermen.

== Sources ==
- Babcock, W.H. (1922) Legendary Islands of the Atlantic: A Study in Medieval Geography New York: American Geographical Society. online
- Cortesão, Armando (1953) "The North Atlantic Nautical Chart of 1424" Imago Mundi, Vol. 10. JSTOR
- Cortesão, Armando (1954) The Nautical Chart of 1424 and the Early Discovery and Cartographical Representation of America. Coimbra and Minneapolis. (Portuguese trans. "A Carta Nautica de 1424", Esparsos, Coimbra. vol. 3)
- Cortesão, Armando (1970) "Pizzigano's Chart of 1424", Revista da Universidade de Coimbra, Vol. 24 (offprint),
