= Giovanni Matteo Contarini =

Italian cartographer

- The 1506 Contarini–Rosselli map
- Born: 1452
- Died: 1507 (aged 54–55)
- Occupation: Cartographer

Giovanni Matteo Contarini (1452-1507) was a cartographer and was a member of a prominent Venetian Contarini family.

== Biography ==
In 1506, Contarini created a world map that Francesco Rosselli later engraved. The Contarini-Rosselli map is the first world map to have Columbus' discoveries incorporated. It was first discovered in 1922 and currently resides in the British Library. On the map, Contarini refers to himself as "famed in the Ptolemaean art" but no other maps by him have surfaced.

In a titular inscription describing his map, Contarini called the land later called America by Martin Waldseemüller the Antipodes. The inscription, placed to the west of this land said:

The world and all its seas on a plane map, Europe, Lybia [i.e., Africa], Asia, and the Antipodes, the poles and zones and sites of places, the parallels for the climes of the mighty globe, lo! Giovanni Matteo Contarini, famed in the Ptolemæan art, has compiled and marked it out. Whither away? Stay, traveller, and behold new nations and a new-found world.

Contarini father was Marco Contarini of San Cassiano.
