= Contarini–Rosselli map =

First printed world map showing the New World

The Contarini–Rosselli map of 1506 was the first printed world map showing the New World.

The Contarini–Rosselli map was designed by Giovanni Matteo Contarini and engraved by Francesco Rosselli. It is a copper-engraved map and was published in Venice or Florence in 1506. The only surviving copy is in the British Library.

== Age of discovery ==
There had been many voyages of discovery in the immediately preceding years:

- Dias’ rounding of Africa (1487)
- the discovery of Newfoundland by John Cabot (1497)
- Vasco da Gama's travel to India (1499)
- the explorations of the Caribbean and South America by Columbus (1492–93, 1493–94, 1498, 1502–04)
- visits to the Caribbean and South America by Vespucci (1499, 1501–02)

Although there had been maps created after these voyages, such as Juan de la Cosa's map of the world in 1500 (based on Columbus' second voyage) and the Cantino world map (circa 1502), the information on these maps was closely guarded. These maps were commissioned by the Portuguese and Spanish governments, which wanted to create trade monopolies over the regions they depicted. The royal powers worried that leaked information about geography could make it easier for other nations to challenge their supremacy. Often a limited number of copies was made, to be held under lock and key.

== Publicizing the shape of the world ==
This situation changed drastically from 1506 to 1507 when three separate efforts to produce world maps were published. The Contarini-Rosselli map of 1506 (now in the British Library) and Martin Waldseemüller's map of the world and globe of 1507 were influential, but not very widely published. There is only one original copy of each in existence, and both of these copies were discovered in the 20th century.

By contrast, Johannes Ruysch's 1507 map of the world was much more widely published and many copies were produced and still exist. It therefore had a very large influence.
