= Marcus Beneventanus =

Marcus Beneventanus (circa 1465–1524) was an Italian philosopher, theologian and astronomer who published maps and books.

== Life ==
He was originally a Celestine monk. He later took up a career in cartography and publishing.

== Bibliography ==
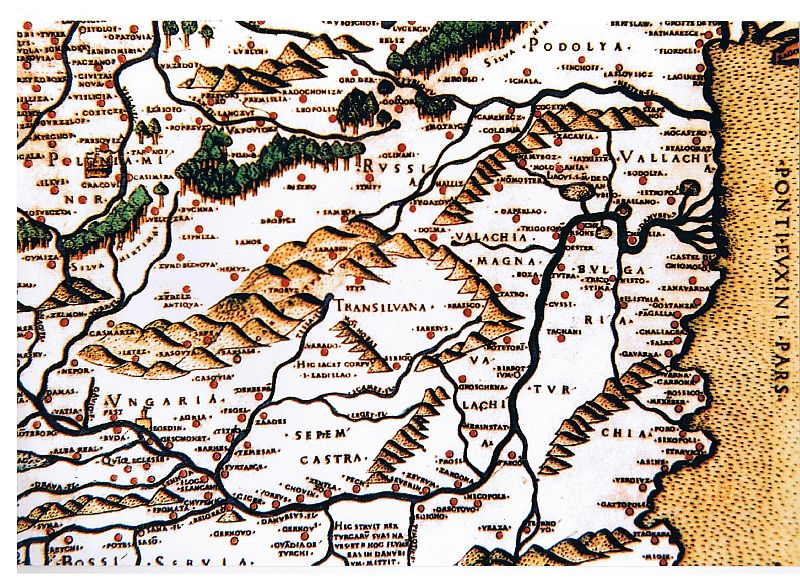
Detail of a map published by Marcus Beneventanus and Bernard Wapowski in 1507.

Notable maps printed by him include:

- Modern map of central and eastern Europe included in the 1507 Rome edition of Ptolemy's Geography.

Notable books printed by him include:

- In hoc opere haec continentur Geographiae Cl. Ptolemaei emẽta : & cu archetypo graeco collata. Planisphaerium Cl. Ptolemaei noviter recognitum et emendatum a Marco Monacho
- Adversus novam marci beneventani astronomiam, quae positionem alphonsinam, de motu octavi orbis multis modis depravavit, apologia
