= Bartolomeo Pareto =

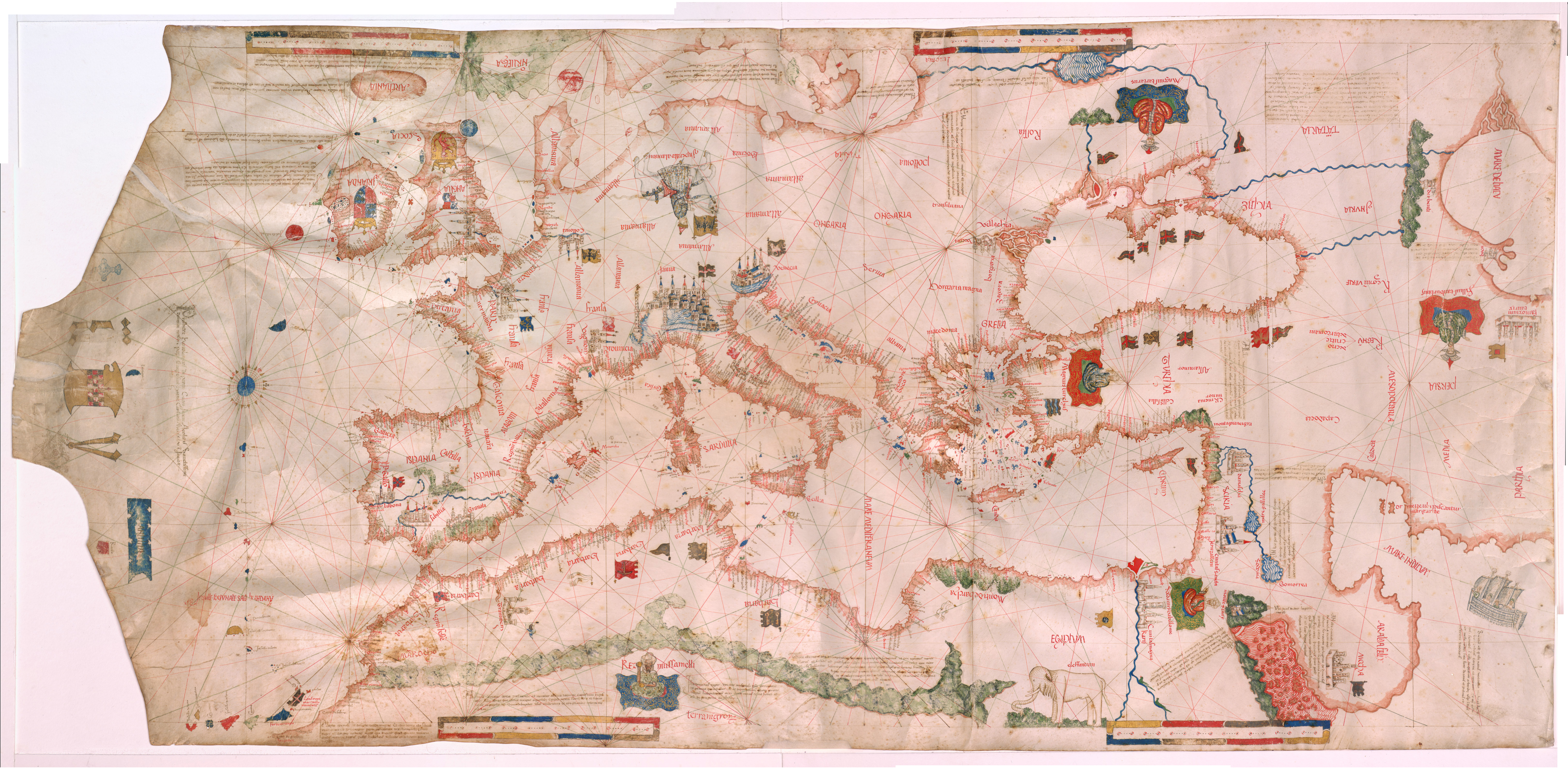
Pareto's 1455 chart.

Bartolomeo Pareto was a medieval priest and cartographer from Genoa who is best known for his sole surviving work, a 1455 nautical chart of the known world. The chart is highly ornate and is notable for its depiction of Antillia, a phantom island said to exist in the Atlantic Ocean. Thought to have been lost in the mid-1800s, the Italian geographer Pietro Amat di San Filippo reported having located it in a storage room in the library of the Roman College in 1877.
