= Johannes Ruysch =

Dutch explorer and cartographer

- Born: c. 1470
- Died: 1533
- Scientific career
- Fields: Astronomy

Johannes Ruysch (c. 1470–1533) was a Dutch cartographer, explorer, painter, and Benedictine monk from Utrecht. He is best known for creating one of the earliest printed maps to depict portions of the New World in his 1508 world map included in an edition of Ptolemy's Geography.

== Biography ==
Born into a noble family, the lords of the dominion of Pijlsweerd, Ruysch studied at the University of Cologne from 1486 to 1489 and then was ordained as a priest and joined the Benedictine cloister of Gross Saint Martin in Cologne. There he worked as a scribe and miniaturist until around 1500. Afterwards he left for Rome, where pope Julius II gave him a dispensation concerning his priestly occupation. He presumably made his world map there in 1507, appears on payrolls in 1508 and 1509 and seems to have specialized in decorative painting. He is thought to be the “Fleming called John”, a close friend of Raphael who at one point resided with him. It has been suggested that he assisted and advised Raphael on his 1509–1510 “Astronomia” and other frescoes in the Stanza della segnatura.

It is thought that he may have accompanied an early English or Portuguese voyage to North America in the early 1500s. Soon he left for Rome, where pope Julius II gave him a dispensation concerning his priestly occupation. He presumably made his world map there in 1507, appears on payrolls in 1508 and 1509 and seems to have specialized in decorative painting. He is thought to be the “Fleming called John”, a close friend of Raphael who at one point resided with him. It has been suggested that he assisted and advised Raphael on his 1509–1510 “Astronomia” and other frescoes in the Stanza della segnatura. Not long after, Ruysch went to work at the Portuguese court as cartographer and astronomer, presumably by recommendation of Julius II who was friends with Manuel I of Portugal. Later, he returned to the St. Martin monastery, suffering from consumption, but able to create a, now lost, astronomical wall painting illustrating the days, months (phases of the Moon), and constellations. He is said to have died at considerable age in 1533 at the monastery, where he had a room adjacent to the library.

== Works ==
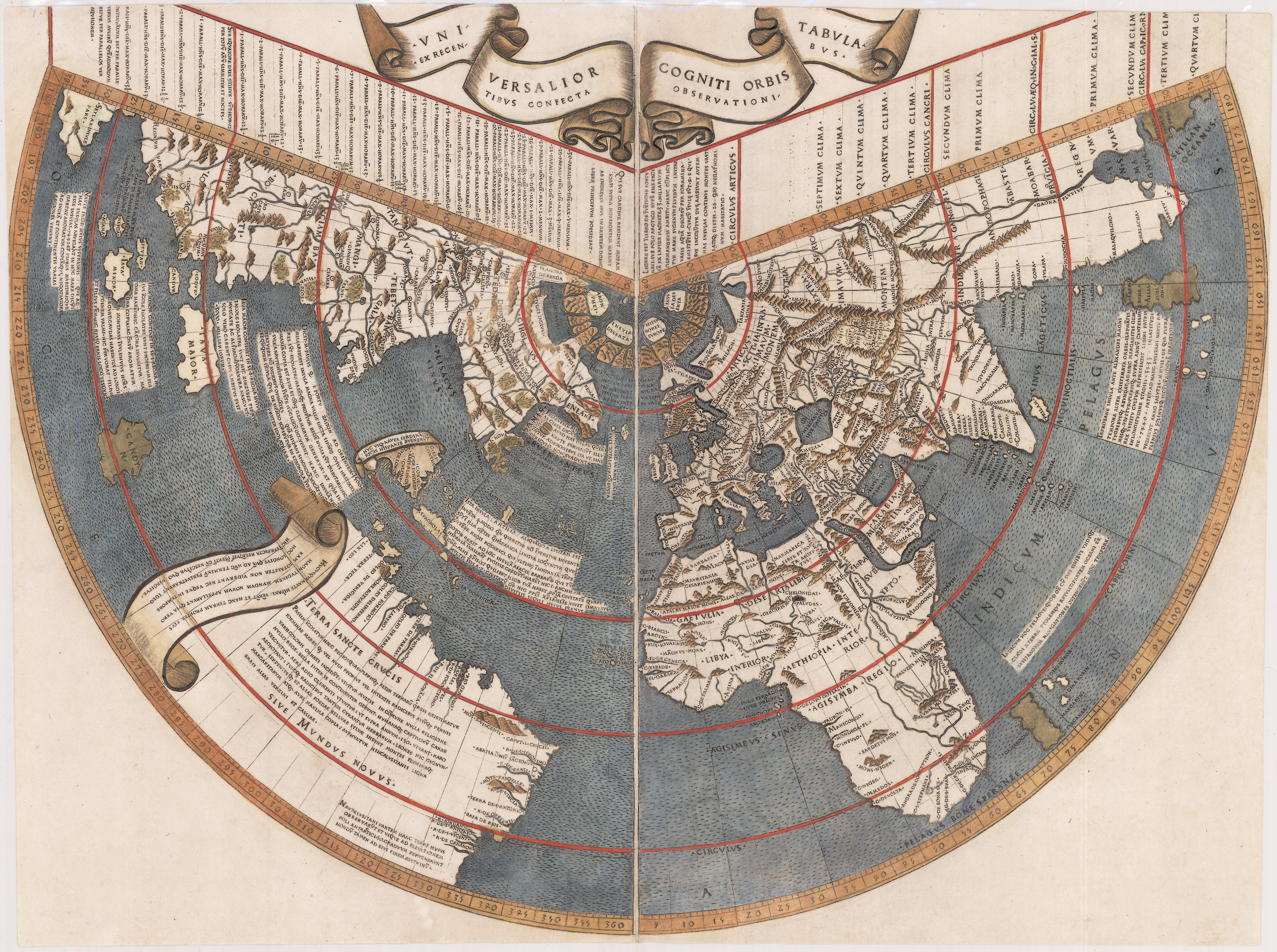
Ruysch's 1507 map of the world.

Ruysch is chiefly known for his world map of 1507, published in the Rome editions of Ptolemy's Geographia in 1507 and 1508. The map is among the earliest printed representations to incorporate geographical information about lands encountered in the western Atlantic following late 15th-century voyages.

The map reflects contemporary geographical knowledge derived from the voyages of Christopher Columbus and John Cabot, as well as information from Portuguese sources and the travel accounts of Marco Polo.

== Publicizing the shape of the world ==
This situation changed drastically from 1506 to 1507 when three separate efforts to produce world maps were published. The Contarini-Rosselli map of 1506 (now in the British Library) and Martin Waldseemüller's map of the world and globe of 1507 were very influential, but not very widely published. There is only one original copy of each in existence, and both of these copies were discovered in the 20th century. By contrast, Johannes Ruysch's 1507 map of the world was much more widely published and many copies were produced and still exist. It therefore had a very large influence.

== The Ruysch Map of 1507 ==
Ruysch's 1507 map of the world was included in the 1507 and 1508 southern editions of Ptolemy's Geographia, an atlas published in Rome. The editor of the 1507 edition of the Geographia was Evangelista Tosinus, a humanist scholar, and the printer was Bernardinus Venetus de Vitalibus, a Venetian printer active in Rome. Because it appeared in printed editions of Ptolemy, the map circulated more widely than many other early sixteenth-century world maps and is among the earliest widely distributed printed maps to incorporate geographical knowledge from the transatlantic voyages of the late 15th century.

The Ruysch map is drawn using the same method for showing the world as the Contarini-Rosselli map, based on an earlier system developed by Ptolemy. It draws on information from the voyages of Christopher Columbus and John Cabot, as well as material from Portuguese sources and from Marco Polo's account of his travels. Some notes on the map appear to come directly from Portuguese geographical knowledge.

Newfoundland is shown connected to Asia in the Ruysch map, as Cabot believed, reflecting the common view before the Pacific Ocean was known that the lands across the Atlantic were part of eastern Asia. The map also notes the presence of codfish in the waters of the Grand Banks of Newfoundland in the northwest Atlantic.

Greenland is shown connected to Newfoundland and Asia on Ruysch's map, and not Europe as earlier maps had shown. Around the north pole, Ruysch drew islands, based on reports in the book Inventio Fortunata of the English friar Nicholas of Lynne. The island above Norway shows remarkable similarities to Svalbard, which would not be discovered until 1597 (by Willem Barents). Ruysch calls it 'European Hyberborea' and a peninsula stretching out towards it is clearly marked with the church of 'Sancti Odulfi', St Olaf's church in Vardø on the Finnmark coast.

Ruysch's map contains the discoveries the Portuguese had made along the African coast. Ruysch's map shows Africa as a peninsula surrounded by water. The horn of Africa on Ruysch's map is at approximately the correct latitude. Ruysch's map shows India as a triangular peninsula with Ceylon in the correct proportion and position.

Ruysch's map has details about Asia based on data gathered by travelers like Marco Polo, as well as Greco-Roman authorities. Unaware of the existence of the Pacific Ocean he, like Christopher Columbus, saw Central and North America as the eastern part of Asia. He accepted that Sipango [Japan] and Hispaniola [Haiti] were one and the same, a concept he expressed in the legend he inscribed on his world map:

Marco Polo says that 1500 miles to the east of the port of ZAITON (Quanzhou) there is a very large island called SIPANGO whose inhabitants are idolaters: they have their own king and pay tribute to none. Here there is a great amount of gold and gems of all kinds. But as the islands discovered by Spanish ships occupy this place, we do not dare to put this island here, believing what the Spaniards call SPAGNOLA to be SIPANGO, for everything that is written of Sipango is found in Spagnola except for the idolatry.

== Map commentary ==
There was a map commentary also included in the 1508 edition, entitled Orbis nouo descriptio and written by an Italian Celestinian monk named Marcus Beneventanus. Beneventanus, wrote in the commentary on the Ruysch map for the 1508 Ptolemy edition:

Johannes Ruysch of Germany, in my judgment a most exact geographer, and a most painstaking one in delineating the globe, to whose aid in this little work I am indebted, has told me that he sailed from the South of England, and penetrated as far as the fifty-third degree of north latitude, and on that parallel he sailed west toward the shores of the East, bearing a little northward and observed many islands.

Commentary: The church "Sancti Odulfi" shown on Ruysch's map, is not the church in Vardø, Finnmark, but the cathedral in Trondheim. It is placed exactly where Trondheim is supposed to be on the map. This cathedral is the very Saint Olaf Cathedral, as it was built upon his grave. The church in Vardø was constructed in AD 1307 and was the first church in Finnmark. So, it was in place long before Ruysch made his map, and to be true, no one knows from what saint it was named. Neither is it any reason for thinking that the island above Norway is meant to be Svalbard. It has no remarkable similarity to Svalbard, and in fact there are four similar islands. Then it is more probable that this feature of the map is inspired by the Inventio Fortunatae, or from the fact that the old cartographers wanted the landmasses to be in balance.
