= Fonseca Island =

Phantom island in the Atlantic Ocean

Coordinates: 12°27′N 54°48′W

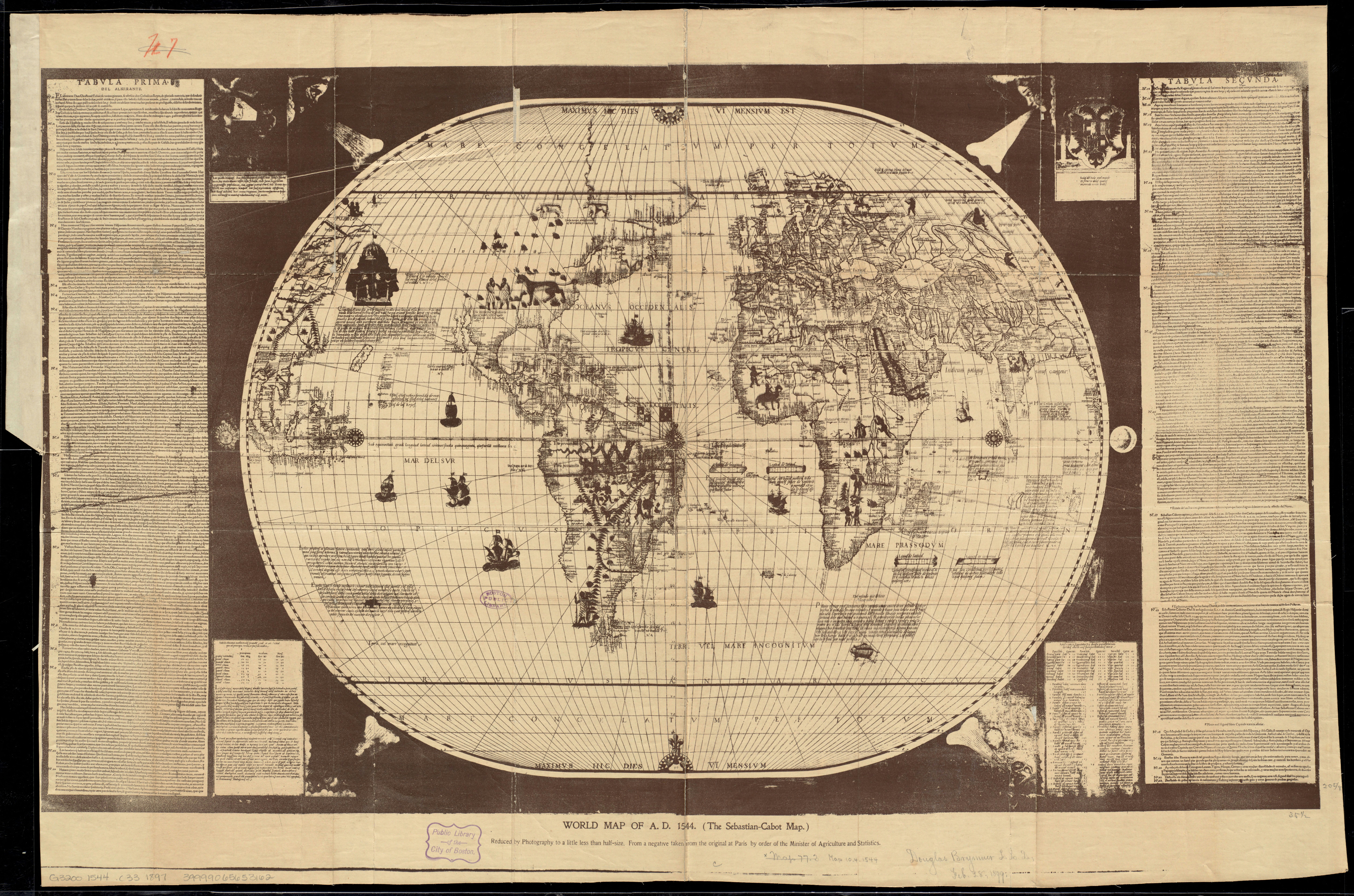
World map by Sebastian Cabot, 1544

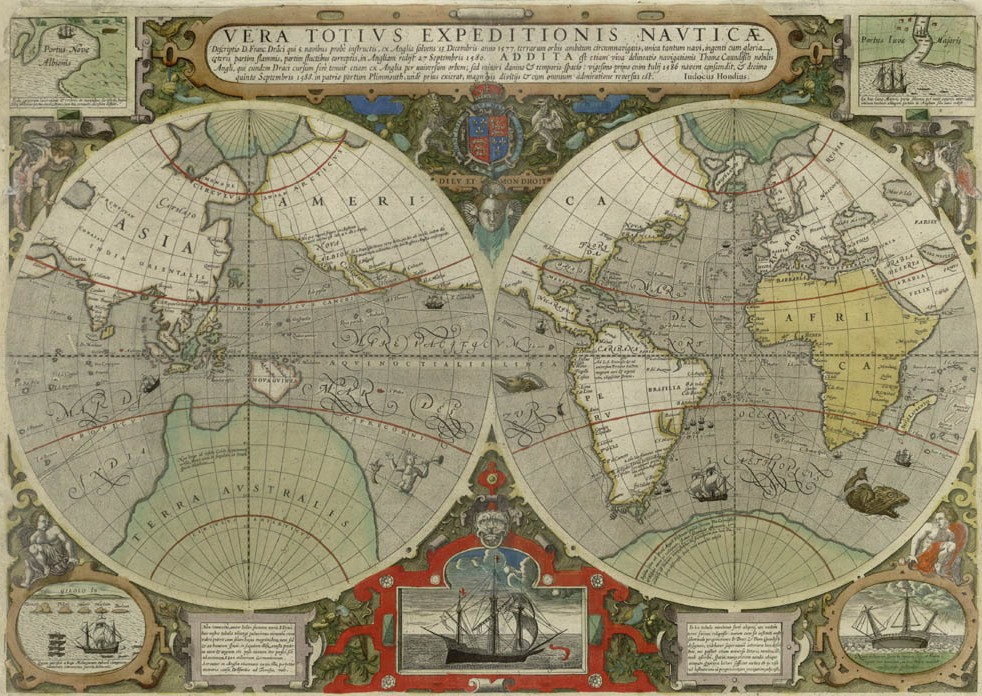
World map by Jodocus Hondius, 1599

Fonseca, also spelled Fonzeca, Fonsequa, or Fonte Seca, other names San Bernardo, San Bernaldo, Galissonière's Rock, is a phantom island which was said to lie in the Atlantic Ocean at 12° 27' N and 54° 48' W, east of Barbados and Tobago.

It is unclear who was responsible for the "discovery" of Fonseca Island. On the world map printed in 1544 by Sebastian Cabot, who was in the service of the English and Spanish crowns, an island is marked northeast of the mouth of the Orinoco named "San Bernardo". With a slightly different position, this island appears in 1599 on the world map by Jodocus Hondius under the name “y de fonte seca”. The name Fonte Seca suggests a Portuguese origin: fonte = source, fountain; seca = dry.

The English geographer Richard Hakluyt located Fonseca in his main work of 1589, Principal navigations, voyages, and discoveries..., at 11° 15' N. This caused King Charles I to give the island to Philip Herbert, Earl of Pembroke & Montgomery, as a fiefdom, although little was known about Fonseca.

In the 1630s, also during the reign of Charles I, John Pym, along with other prominent Puritans, founded the Providence Island Company to help settlers of the Massachusetts Bay Colony disaffected by the climate to resettle in the more pleasant region of the Caribbean. The island of Fonseca was originally chosen as the destination. The ship Elisabeth, with twenty emigrants aboard, set sail, but since Fonseca could not be found, they sailed to Providencia Island, Colombia, instead and founded a settlement there.

Until then, no one had set foot on the island. In 1682 a book by an unknown author who went by "J.S." was published. (This was possibly John Shirley [fl. 1680–1702], author of The Illustrious History of Women [1686].) He claimed that a sailor told him that during a storm he had escaped to the island of Fonseca, which was populated by good-looking women, with male children being sent away at an early age. The women spoke Welsh and were survivors of an expedition led by Owen Gwynnidd. The climate was pleasant and the inhabitants, who were moon worshipers, received him kindly.

A report published in 1708 is also unlikely to be based on facts. It is said to recount the experiences of two captains of a Turkish warship who landed on Fonseca in 1707. The island, which was supposedly located near Barbados, was inhabited by British settlers with African slaves. The inhabitants were given to quarreling, drinking, gambling, gossip, and swearing. Fonseca is probably confused with another island in the Antilles or with the island of Providencia, which today belongs to Colombia.

Soundings in 1852 proved there was no island at the purported location, but Fonseca continued to appear on maps as late as 1866. Fonseca appears southwest of Barbados in Keith Johnston's 1861 General Atlas. The English geographer and hydrographer Alexander George Findlay (1812–1875) records Fonseca in his navigation manual of 1853 as a vigia under the name "Galissonière's Rock" (named after the French naval officer Roland-Michel Barrin de La Galissonière), but with a question mark.

Galissoniere's Rock, about 12° 20' N., and 54° 49' W. This vigia was exhibited on the chart of M. Rochette, as a rock, mentioned by M. Galissoniere, and some other navigators. A spot, nearly in the same situation, had previously been called the Isle of Fonseca. It is said to have been seen by the Rainbow, man-of-war. We have been vaguely informed, that the rock was again seen in 1822.

— Alexander George Findlay, Memoir, descriptive and explanatory, of the Northern Atlantic Ocean

In later editions of his work, a note declares "2,570 fathoms found; perhaps volcanic."

One can assume that Fonseca was one of the islands of the Lesser Antilles whose position was incorrectly determined. Such serious navigational errors were not uncommon in the 15th and 16th centuries, especially in measuring longitude.
