= Georg Hassel =

Johann Georg Heinrich Hassel (30 December 1770 in Wolfenbüttel – 18 January 1829 in Weimar) was a German geographer and statistician. He was an influential figure in the early 19th century and published several large books of geography and statistics. Hassel was elected a Foreign Honorary Member of the American Academy of Arts and Sciences in 1828.
