= Mayda =

Phantom island in the Atlantic Ocean

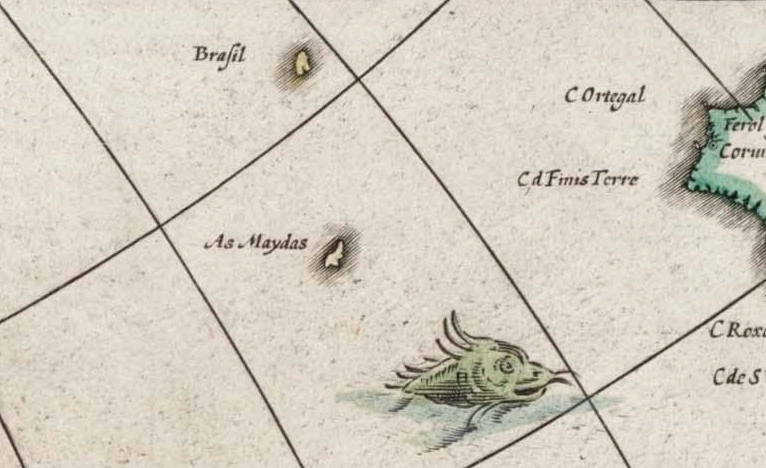
Mayda on a 1649 map by Willem Blaeu

Mayda (variously known as Maida, Mayd, Mayde, Brazir, Mam, Asmaida, Asmayda, Bentusle, Las Maidas Bolunda, and Vlaanderen) is a phantom island in the North Atlantic Ocean that appeared on maps from the 14th century until the early 20th century. Typically depicted as crescent-shaped and positioned west of Brittany or southwest of Ireland, approximately at 46° to 48° N latitude, Mayda was among the most persistent of the Atlantic phantom islands. Alexander von Humboldt observed around 1836 that of the numerous legendary Atlantic islands, only Mayda and Brazil Rock still appeared on contemporary charts.

== Description ==
Mayda was most commonly represented as a crescent-shaped island, a form that distinguished it from the circular depictions typical of other phantom islands such as Brasil. The island's position varied considerably across different maps, though it was most often placed in the open Atlantic far west of lower Brittany and more or less southwest of Ireland. Over time, its charted location migrated westward toward the Americas, with some later maps positioning it near Newfoundland, Bermuda, or the West Indies.

== History ==
=== Medieval appearances ===
The island first appeared as Brazir on the Pizzigani brothers' 1367 portolan chart, depicted in crescent form southwest of the island of Brasil at approximately the latitude of southern Brittany. It subsequently appeared under the name Mam or Insula de Mam on the Catalan Atlas of 1375, and as Jonzele on the Pinelli map of 1384.

The Andrea Bianco atlas of 1436 depicted the island as Bentusla (or Bentufla), maintaining its characteristic crescent shape near the latitude of Brittany. The 1513 edition of Ptolemy's Geography edited by Martin Waldseemüller showed the island as Asmaidas. The prefixed syllable "As-" may initially suggest a Portuguese origin for the name, but the same map also renders Gomera as "Agomera", Madeira as "Amadera", and Brasil as "Obrassil", indicating merely a cartographic convention of adding the definite article to island names.

Abraham Ortelius, in his Theatrum Orbis Terrarum (1570), placed a crescent-shaped island in Mayda's traditional location but labelled it Vlaenderen ("Flanders").

=== Later persistence ===
Mayda proved remarkably persistent on charts. It appeared on Willem Blaeu's 1649 Americae nova Tabula and continued to feature on maps well into the 19th century. John Purdy's world map of 1834 still included the island, as noted by Humboldt. A relief map published in Chicago and copyrighted 1906 exhibited Mayda, which the geographer William H. Babcock characterised as "a crowning instance of cartographic conservation".

== Etymology ==
The origin of the name Mayda remains uncertain. While the island's name has sometimes been attributed to Arabic origins—the Moors having sailed the eastern Atlantic after their conquest of Spain and named some of the Azores—the name does not appear in any known Moorish texts or maps. Babcock noted that the name "is unlike all the other names in the sea" and that "its origin remains unexplained".

== Legacy ==
The island is the namesake of Mayda Insula, an approximately 168 kilometres (104 mi) diameter feature in the Kraken Mare on Saturn's moon Titan, named by the International Astronomical Union in 2008.

== In popular culture ==
The island of Mayda is a principal location in the novel A Web of Air (2010) by Philip Reeve, where it is depicted as a crater city off the coast of Portugal.

== See also ==
- Brasil (mythical island)
- List of phantom islands
