= Royllo =

15th-century phantom island

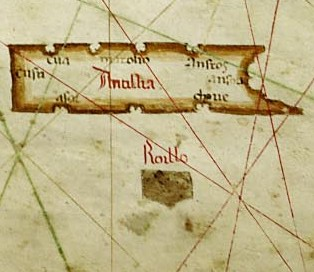
Albino de Canepa, 1489. Showing "Roillo" right west of Antillia

Royllo (also Roillo), is a legendary phantom island that was once thought to be located in the Atlantic Ocean. It is probably identical with the island originally called Ymana in a 1424 nautical chart of Zuane Pizzigano. The island is usually depicted in many 15th-century maps as a small island located slightly to the west (20 leagues or so) of the much larger island of Antillia. It is often found in the group insulae de novo repertae, or "newly discovered islands" along with other legendary islands.
