= Corbitis Atlas =

Late 14-century atlas of four portolan charts

The Corbitis Atlas (sometimes called the Corbizzi or Combitis) is a late 14th-century atlas of four portolan charts, composed by an anonymous Venetian cartographer, and held by the Biblioteca Nazionale Marciana in Venice, Italy.

== Background ==
The atlas was made by an anonymous Venetian cartographer, possibly by the same author of the Pinelli–Walckenaer Atlas. The Corbitis atlas was once believed to be dated 1368 (on account of a misreading of the label y(sole) 368 on the fifth folio). More recent readings suggest it was made between 1384 and 1410, with possible later emendations.

The map has the simple inscription "hec tabula ex testamento d[omi]nj nicholaj de co[r]bitis deuenit monast[eri]o cart[husiano] flore[ntino]", implying the Corbitis atlas must have belonged to a certain Corbizzi family of Florence in the 14th century, and was held by the monastery of Certosa del Galluzzo. The inscription was previously misread as "Combitis", a name by which the atlas is sometimes referred to in older sources.

The Corbitis Atlas is currently held (Ms. It. VI 213) by the Biblioteca Nazionale Marciana in Venice, Italy.

== Features ==
The Corbitis atlas is composed of four portolan charts, each measuring 31 × 19 cm, with each chart covering two folios:

- P. 1 – covers the east Mediterranean and Black Sea.
- P. 2 – covers the central Mediterranean
- P. 3 – covers the west Mediterranean and the north Atlantic coast up to the British isles.
- P. 4 – covers the south Atlantic islands and west African coast.

The third sheet (North Atlantic) includes the mythical islands of y.fortunate, y beate, y.368 and the montagna de sco brandan (Saint Brendan's Island).

The fourth sheet (South Atlantic) covers the west African coast down to inbugder (Cape Bojador) and several Atlantic islands, using the same labels found already in earlier charts (e.g. the 1351 Medici Atlas, the 1367 Pizzigani brothers chart, etc.). As laid out in the Corbitis atlas, the islands are:

- the Azores, laid out vertically from north to south, and named: y de corui marini (Corvo), liconigi (Flores), sco zorzi (São Jorge), y la uentura (Faial), li colonbi (Pico), y de brazil (Terceira), caprara (São Miguel) and louo (Santa Maria).
- the Madeira archipelago, with the names y de legname (Madeira), porto santo (Porto Santo), desertas (Desertas) and further south, y. saluaze (Savage Islands).
- the Canary Islands, only the central and eastern clusters are depicted, and include y de rinferno (Tenerife), y de canaria (Gran Canaria), y de uegi marini (Lobos), forte uentura (Fuerteventura), Grazioxa (Graciosa) and y de lanzaroto maloxeli (Lanzarote).
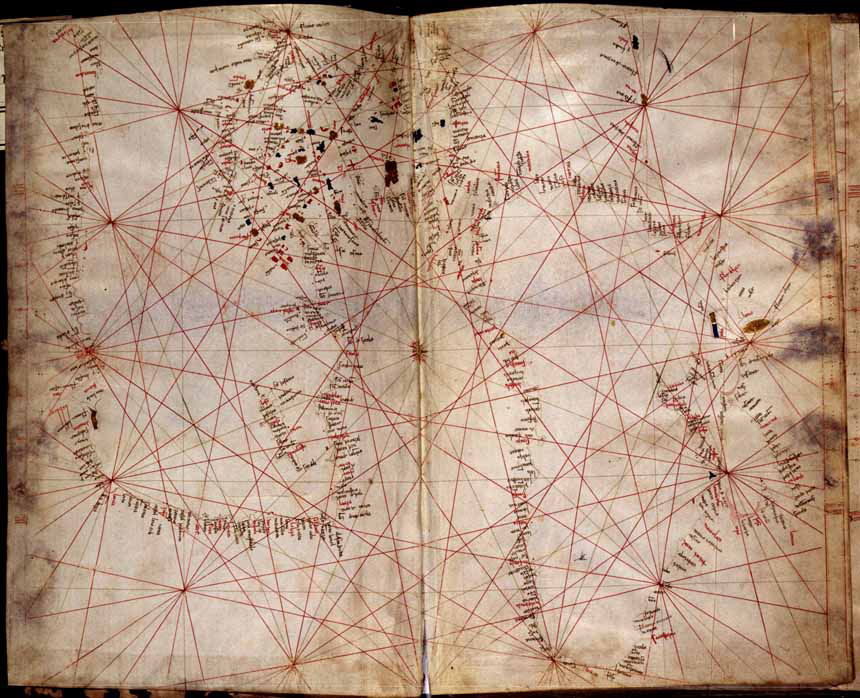
Corbitis Atlas, p. 1 (East Mediterranean and Black Sea)

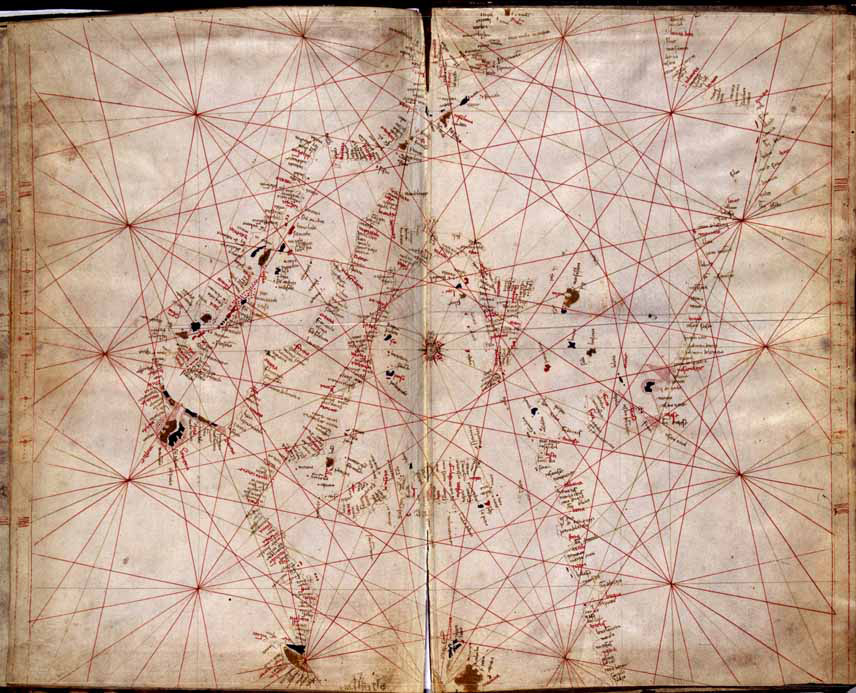
Corbitis Atlas, p. 2 (Central Mediterranean)

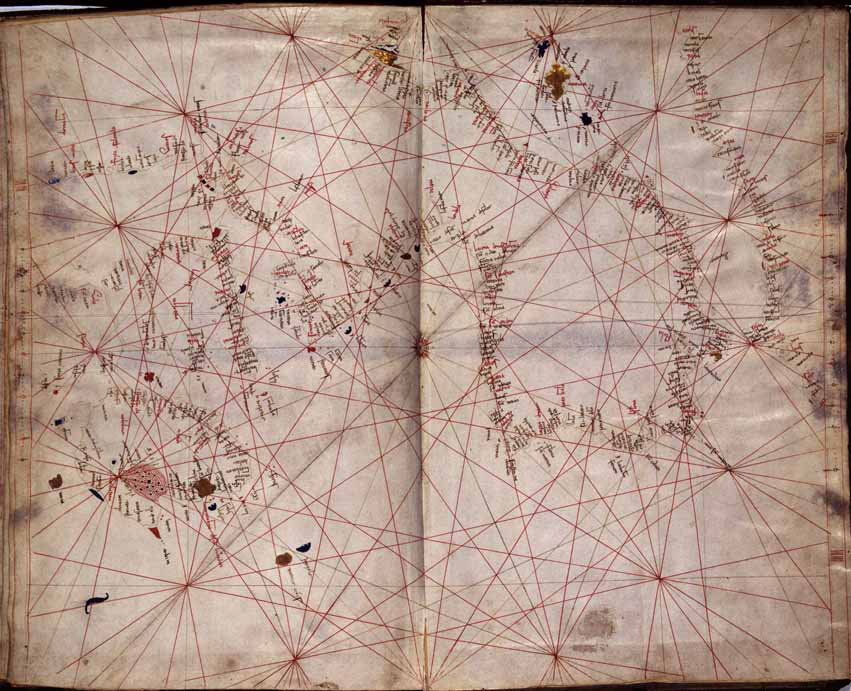
Corbitis Atlas, p. 3 (West Mediterranean and north Atlantic)

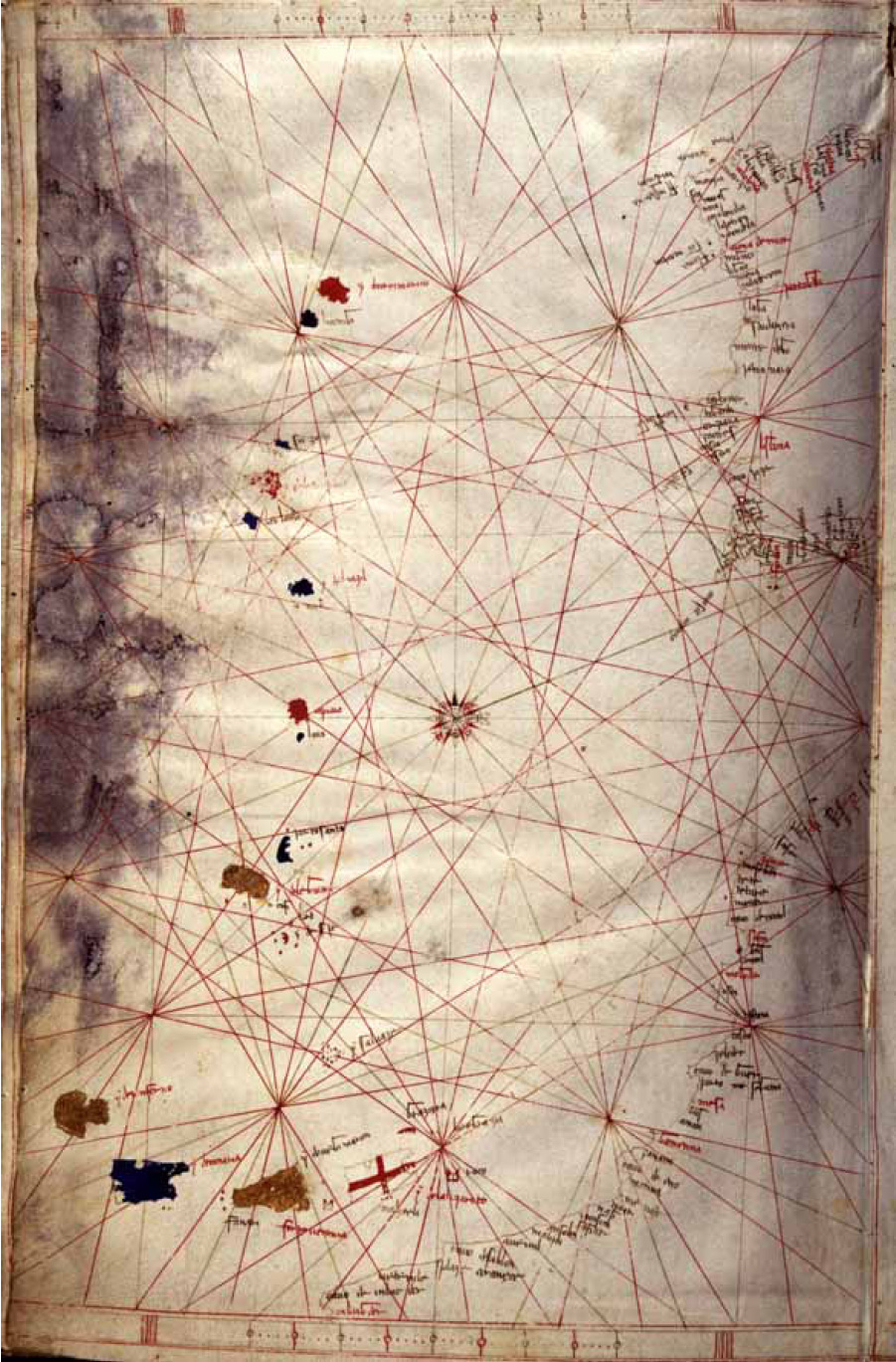
Corbitis Atlas, p. 4 (South Atlantic and islands)

== Sources ==
- "l'atlante Corbitis": note and exhibition at GeoWeb, Biblioteca Nazionale Marciana of Venice.
- Campbell, T. (2011) "Anonymous works and the question of their attribution to individual chartmakers or to their supposed workshops", (online, accessed July 14, 2011)
