= Book of Knowledge of All Kingdoms =

14th-century Castilian geographical and armorial manual

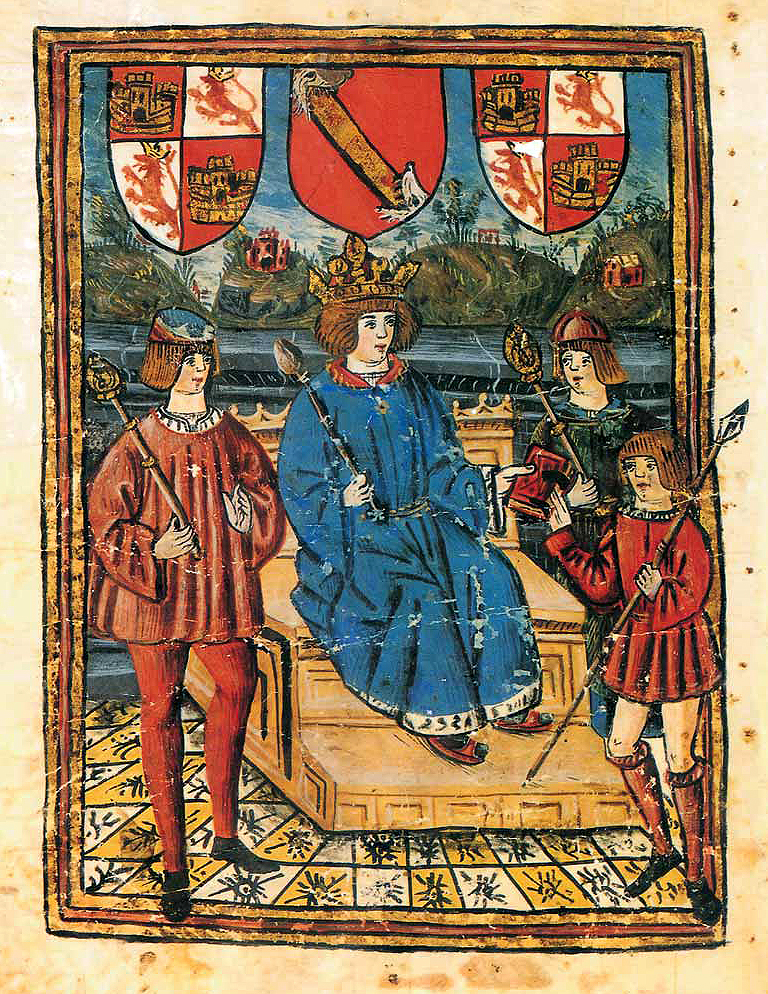
Title page illustration of the "Z" manuscript, with the coat of arms of Castile and León and the Royal Bend of Castile of Alfonso XI.

TheBook of Knowledge of All Kingdoms (Old Spanish: Libro del Conosçimiento de todos los rregnos; also the Book of All Kingdoms) is an anonymous 14th-century Castilian geographical and armorial manual (dated to c. 1385). It is written in the form of imaginary autobiographical travelogue of a Castilian mendicant friar, as he travels through the entire world, known and fanciful, from the westernmost Atlantic islands, through Europe, Asia, Africa and the Arctic, identifying all the lands, kings, lords and their armorial devices as he passes them. The only explicit information is that the anonymous author claims to have been born in Castile in 1305.

The full title is also cited as Libro del conosçimiento de todos los reynos y tierras y señoríos que son por el mundo, et de las señales et armas que han cada tierra y señorío por sy y de los reyes y señores que los proueen "Book of the Knowledge of all the Kingdoms, Lands and Lordships that are in the World, and the arms and devices of each land and lordship, or of the kings and lords who possess them" (Markham 1912).

The book's principal objective may have been as an armorial roll. Its choice of presenting itself in the form of an imaginary travelogue may have been whimsical, to tap into the fashionable travel literature of the era, popularized by Marco Polo and John Mandeville. Its geographical features are closely related to those of the Medici Atlas (notionally dated 1351, but probably c.1370). Also near-contemporary is the Catalan Atlas.

== Manuscript locations ==
Four manuscripts of the work are known, designated "Z", "N", "R" and "S".

A manuscript copy of the Libro, once owned by the 16th-century historian Jerónimo Zurita y Castro, and subsequently held by the count of San Clemente in Zaragoza, was reported lost sometime around 1680. It is believed this was the manuscript that resurfaced in London in 1978, popularly known as Manuscript "Z", currently held by the Bavarian State Library in Munich, as "Cod.hisp. 150". This manuscript, written in the late 14th century, is replete with miniature illuminations drawn by an Aragonese illustrator. A facsimile was published in 1999. In the introduction to that edition, editor Lacarra doubts the original c.1350 dating, and proposes instead that the Libro was probably composed a bit later, probably around 1385.

Manuscripts "N" and "R" are kept in the British Library.

A further manuscript of the Libro was discovered in 1874 and compiled and published in 1877 in Madrid, by Marcos Jiménez de la Espada. This is the most complete of the extant copies, known as Manuscript "S", kept in the Spanish National Library. In his introduction, the editor presented the book as an authentic travelogue of a Castilian Franciscan mendicant friar written around 1350. However, immediately upon its appearance, contemporary scholars (not without a touch of mockery at the editor) noted the travelogue was largely fantastical and imaginary, and that there was no clear indication that the author was a friar, Franciscan or otherwise.
