= Pinelli–Walckenaer Atlas =

14th-century nautical atlas

The Pinelli–Walckenaer Atlas is a late 14th-century atlas of portolan charts, explicitly dated 1384, primarily composed by an anonymous Venetian cartographer, and held by the British Library.

== Background ==
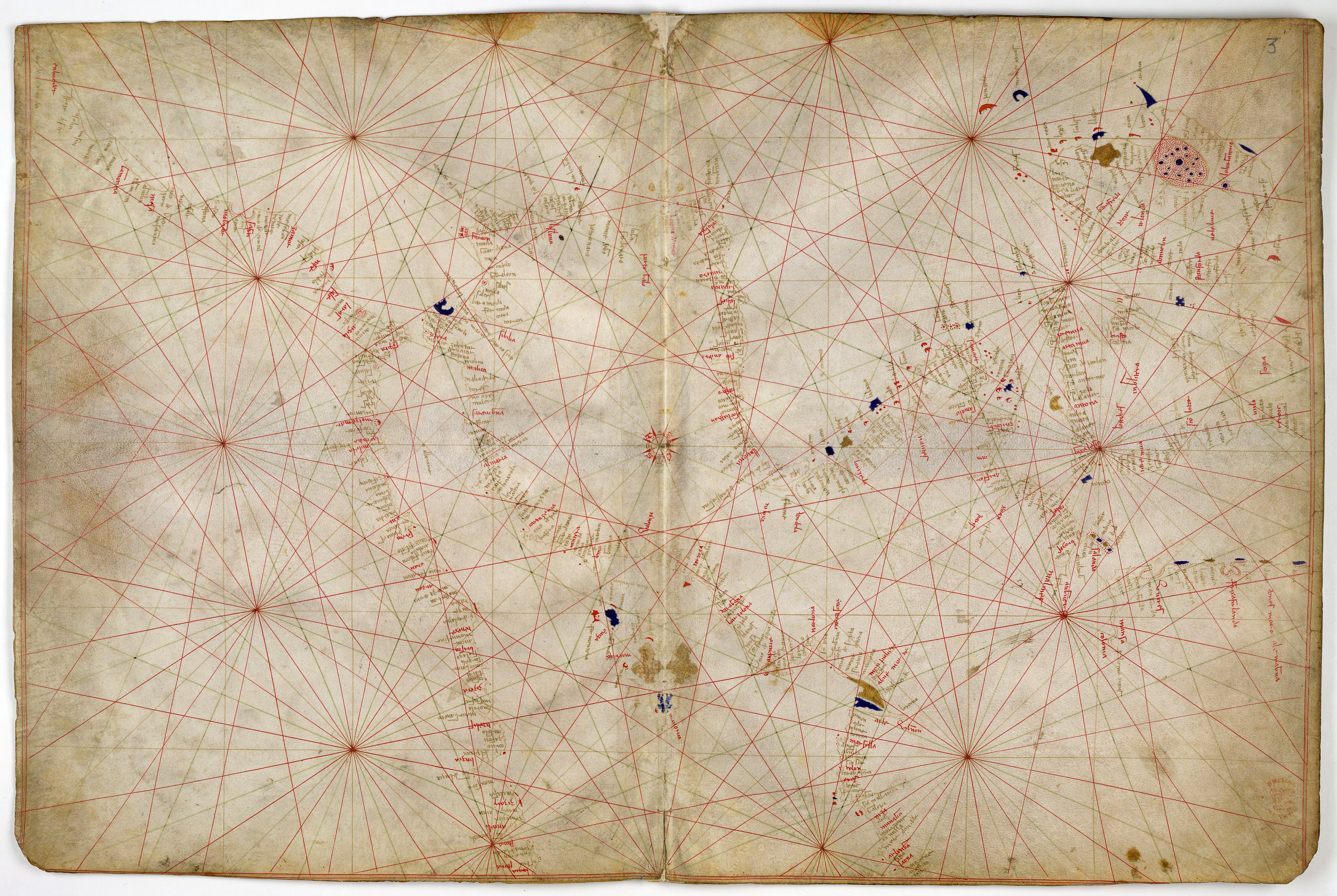
Third sheet of the Pinelli-Walckenaer (North Atlantic and West Mediterranean)

The Pinelli-Walckenaer atlas was primarily composed by an anonymous Venetian cartographer (although some suggest Genoese), probably the same person who made the similar Corbitis Atlas. The Pinelli-Walckenaer atlas is explicitly dated 1384 (according to its calendar), but some scholars believe it to have been made a little later (c. 1410). Two of the charts in the atlas (the specific charts for the Aegean and the Adriatic) were definitely later additions by someone else and not part of the original atlas. One suggestion is that the latter two charts were made by the Venetian cartographer Francesco de Cesanis around 1434. The calendar itself might date from 1458.

The name of the atlas refers to its previous owners. It was in the possession of the Pinelli family of Venice, which owned the atlas for many years, until it was purchased in 1790 by the Baron Charles Athanase Walckenaer of Paris.

The Pinelli-Walckenaer atlas is currently held by the British Library (Add MS, 19510) in London.

== Features ==
The Pinelli-Walckenaer atlas is composed of seven sheets:

1. astronomical calendar
2. South Atlantic (Iberian Peninsula and northwest Africa)
3. North Atlantic and west Mediterranean (incl. British isles)
4. East Mediterranean and Black Sea
5. Central Mediterranean
6. Adriatic Sea
7. Aegean Sea

The first calendar sheet explicitly dates the atlas 1384. Sheets 1-5 were made by the same anonymous person in the late 14th or early 15th century, while sheets 6-7 were made by someone else (possibly Cesanis) in the second quarter of the 15th century.

== See also ==
- Corbitis Atlas

== Sources ==
- For a zoomable version of sheets 2 & 3, online gallery at the British Library
- Beazley, C.R. (1906) The Dawn of Modern Geography. London. vol. 3
- Campbell, T. (1987) "Portolan charts from the late thirteenth century to 1500," in J.B. Harley and D. Woodward, editors, The History of Cartography, Vol. 1 - Cartography in Prehistoric, Ancient, and Medieval Europe and the Mediterranean. Chicago: University of Chicago Press, p. 371-63 online (PDF)
- Campbell, T. (2011) "Anonymous works and the question of their attribution to individual chartmakers or to their supposed workshops"(online, accessed July 14, 2011).
- D'Avezac, M.A.C. (1847) Fragment d'une notice sur un atlas manuscrit venitien de la bibliotheque Walckenaer. Paris: Martinet. online
- Pujades i Bataller, Ramon J. (2007) Les cartes portolanes: la representació medieval d'una mar solcada. Barcelona: Institut Cartogràfic de Catalunya.
