= Medici-Laurentian Atlas =

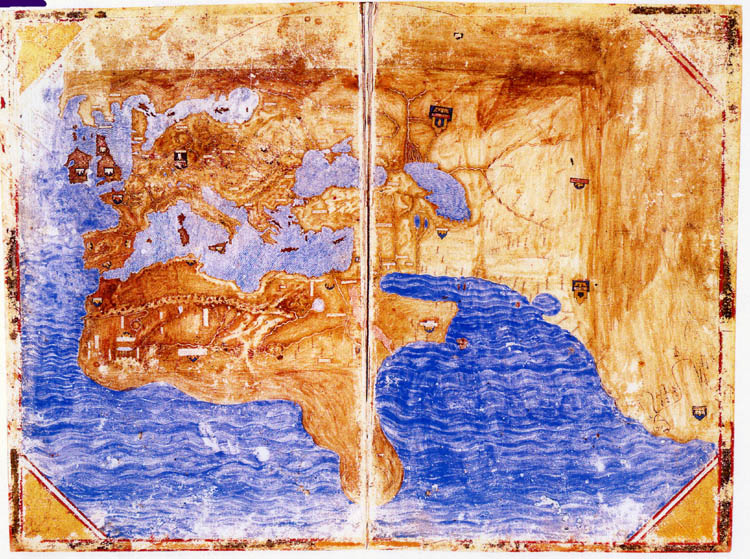
World map from the Medici-Laurentian atlas, 1351.

The Medici-Laurentian Atlas, also known simply as the Medici Atlas (and other variants, e.g. "Laurenziano Gaddiano", "Laurentian Portolano", "Atlante Mediceo" or "Laurentian Atlas"), is an anonymous 14th-century set of maps, probably composed by a Genoese cartographer and explicitly dated 1351, although most historians believe it was composed, or at least retouched, later. The atlas is currently held by the Biblioteca Medicea Laurenziana in Florence, Italy.

== Background ==
The author of the Medici-Laurentian atlas is unknown, save that he comes from the Liguria region of Italy (probably Genoese), and might have composed it for a Florentine owner. The atlas is explicitly dated 1351 (as per its astronomical calendar), but scholars believed it was more likely composed around 1370, possibly from earlier material, and probably amended further later, with emendations as late as 1425–50.

A 1370 date would place it in between the Pizzigani brothers map of 1367 and the Catalan Atlas of 1375, both of which share elements of the Medici-Laurentian map, although it is impossible to tell exactly if it preceded or followed them. It is also contemporaneous with the Libro del Conoscimiento, a fantastical travelogue by an unknown Castilian author, believed to have been written sometime between 1350 and 1399, with which it shares many significant geographic features. The book's author may have inspired, or have been inspired by, the Medici-Laurentian atlas.

The Atlas is currently held by the Biblioteca Medicea Laurenziana in Florence, Italy (Gaddi. Rel. 9).

== Features ==
The Medici-Laurentian atlas is composed of eight sheets. The first sheet is an astronomical calendar, the second sheet contains an unusual world map, the third, fourth and fifth sheets compose a typical 14th-century portolan chart (covering Europe, North Africa, the Mediterranean and Black Seas), the sixth, seventh and eighth sheets are specialized charts of the Aegean Sea, Adriatic Sea and Caspian Sea.

=== World map ===
The second sheet, the world map, is the one that has attracted most attention. If the original date 1351 is true, that would make it the first (extant) map to incorporate the travel reports of Marco Polo and Ibn Batuta. It shows Asia up to India, marking places like the Delhi Sultanate and others with reasonable accuracy. The atlas also shows the Caspian as a closed sea (unusual for maps of that time).

Among the most startling features is its depiction of the recognizable shape of the continent of Africa with remarkable precision. Nearly a century before the Portuguese Age of Discovery, the Medici atlas draws the bend of the Gulf of Guinea and shows that Africa has a southern end, i.e. that the Atlantic and Indian Oceans are connected to each other below the African continent.

While the remarkable shape of Africa has given rise to speculative theories about ancient sailing and secret voyages, the explanation is probably more mundane. The probable source of the "Guinea bend" is the legend of the Sinus Aethiopicus, the rumor of a gulf that lay somewhere south of Cape Bojador that was said to penetrate deeply into the African continent. This gulf is described in the fantastical travelogue of the Libro del Conoscimiento (possibly as early as 1350) and finds itself again in the Fra Mauro map (1459), well before it was discovered by Portuguese explorers. The notion that the West African coast did not extend straight south but took a sharp eastward bend, could be a hazy reference to the actual Gulf of Guinea, but more probably it was just a lucky guess and a bit of wishful thinking. (Historian Russell notes that the Portuguese Prince Henry the Navigator was entranced by the legend of the Sinus Aethiopicus, as it held out the prospect of a direct sea route around West Africa to the Christian kingdom of Prester John (Ethiopian Empire), avoiding the complications of travelling through the Muslim lands of Egypt to reach it. In the Medici Atlas, the depth of the penetration of the Sinus indeed almost reaches Ethiopia.)

As for the southward extension of the East African coast, uncommon for European maps, this was probably drawn from Arab sources, who would have known of the commercial traffic down the Muslim Swahili coast to Sofala. Finally, the connection between the two oceans under South Africa just ratifies the old assumption (from Biblical and Classical authority) that all the world's great water bodies were connected to each other. An Africa surrounded by water is already found on other maps (e.g. Pietro Vesconte's c. 1320 mappa mundi). Long before the Medici map, the Vivaldi brothers of Genoa, in 1291, had tried to sail down the west African coast, with the explicit objective of trying to find a sea route to Asia.

The imaginary nature of Africa's shape in the Medici map is almost proven by noticing there are no names or details given below Cape Bojador. The great exception is the legendary "River of Gold", the "western Nile" of Arab sources (i.e. the Senegal River, assumed connected to the Niger River, flowing through the heart of the gold-producing Mali Empire). This is the same Palolus river as in the Pizzigani brothers map of 1367. If one elects to date the Medici Atlas before the Pizzigani, then this is the first European map depicting that all-important river.

=== Atlantic islands ===
The Medici Atlas is also important for the history of the north Atlantic islands. It is probably the first map to benefit from the 1341 mapping expedition to the Canary Islands, sponsored by King Afonso IV of Portugal and commanded by the Florentine Angiolino del Tegghia de Corbizzi and the Genoese Nicoloso da Recco. The expedition is said to have visited thirteen Canary islands (seven major and six minor). The Medici Atlas shows most of the main Canary islands, excellently delineated (if not yet fully named), greatly improving upon the couple in the 1339 Angelino Dulcert map.

The Medici Atlas shows also for the first time, and almost correctly placed, the Madeira archipelago, with their modern names: Porto sto (Porto Santo), I. de lo Legname (Madeira, legname is Ligurian for "wood") and I dexerta (Desertas). The Madeira archipelago will not be officially discovered by the Portuguese until c. 1420. These names could have been in the original, or retouched later - although these same names were already given in the Libro del Conoscimiento.

The Medici Atlas also seems to show the location of the Azores, being the first to do so. They are depicted northwest of the Madeira group, aligned on a north to south axis, rather than trailing diagonally from northwest to southeast. The islands are not all individually named, but rather named by cluster. Most southerly are the insule de Cabrera ("Goat islands", encompassing two islands, what seem like Santa Maria and São Miguel), further north is the individually named Insula Brasi ("island of embers/fire" (volcanic?) or "dyewood", either of which point to Terceira, but could also be the legendary Irish Brazil), then, just west of it, a group called insule de Ventura Sive de Columbis ("islands of venture/winds or the pigeons", three islands, probably São Jorge, Faial and Pico), and then, furthest north, are a cluster of two islands labelled insule de Corvis Marinis ('islands of the sea crows', Corvo and Flores). Only Graciosa seems to be missing.

These Azores islands appear with these names in two subsequent Majorcan maps - the 1375 Catalan Atlas and the 1385 map of Guillem Soler, with some more detailed sorting of the groups, e.g. Medici's "Ventura Sive de Columbis" label is broken into three distinct names: "San Zorzo" ("St. George", S. Jorge), Ventura (Faial) and Li Columbis (Pico); and the pair of "Corvis Marinis" are distinguished between Corvis Marinis (Corvo) and Li Conigi ("rabbits", Flores). The anonymous Castilian author of the Libro del Conoscimiento also supplies these names, breaking up the southerly Cabrera group (which the Catalan forgot) into the islands of las cabras ("goats", S. Miguel) and lobo ("seals"? S. Maria).

None of the Azores islands will be officially discovered until nearly a century later, in the 1430s and 1440s. They could simply be purely legendary, possibly of Andalusian Arab origin (e.g. al-Idrisi speaks of an Atlantic island of wild goats (the Cabras) and another of "cormorants", a scavenger bird, possibly the "sea crows" of Corvis Marinis?). But outside their erroneous axis tilt, the Azores do seem clustered with reasonable accuracy on the Medici atlas. One (unproven) possibility is that the Azores were indeed discovered, or at least seen from a distance, quite by accident, by the aforementioned 1341 mapping expedition on their return via a long sailing arc (volta do mar) from the Canary islands.

== Sources ==
- Anonymous Spanish friar (c. 1350 - 1399) El Libro del Conosçimiento de todos los rregnos et tierras e señoríos que son por el mundo et de las señales et armas que han cada tierra y señorío por sy y de los reyes y señores que los proueen, escrito por un franciscano español á mediados del siglo XIV (Marcos Jiménez de la Espada ed., 1877, Madrid: Impr. de T. Fortanet online)
- Babcock, W.H. (1922) Legendary islands of the Atlantic: a study in medieval geography New York: American Geographical Society. online
- Beazley, C. Raymond (1899) "Introduction" in C.R. Beazley and E. Prestage, 1898–99, The Chronicle of the Discovery and Conquest of Guinea, London: Halyut. v.2
- Beazley, C.R. (1906) The Dawn of Modern Geography. London. vol. 3
- Campbell, T. (2011) "Anonymous works and the question of their attribution to individual chartmakers or to their supposed workshops", (online, accessed 14 July 2011)
- Cortesão, Armando (1954) The Nautical Chart of 1424 and the Early Discovery and Cartographical Representation of America. Coimbra and Minneapolis. (Portuguese trans. "A Carta Nautica de 1424", published in 1975, Esparsos, Coimbra. vol. 3)
- Fischer, T. (1886) Sammlung mittelalterlicher Welt- und Seekarten italienischen Ursprungsund aus italienischen Bibliotheken und Archiven Venice: F. Ongania. online
- Marcel, Gabriel (1887) "Note sur une carte catalane de Dulceri datée de 1339", Comptes rendus des séances de la Société de Géographie. (pp. 28–35)
- Russell, Peter E. (2000) Prince Henry 'the Navigator': a life. New Haven, Conn: Yale University Press.
- Petrus Amat di S. Filippo (1892) "I veri Scopritori dell Isole Azore", Bollettino della Società geografica italiana, Vol. 29, pp. 529–41
