= Azorean real =

Azorean Real
Moeda Insulana (Portuguese)
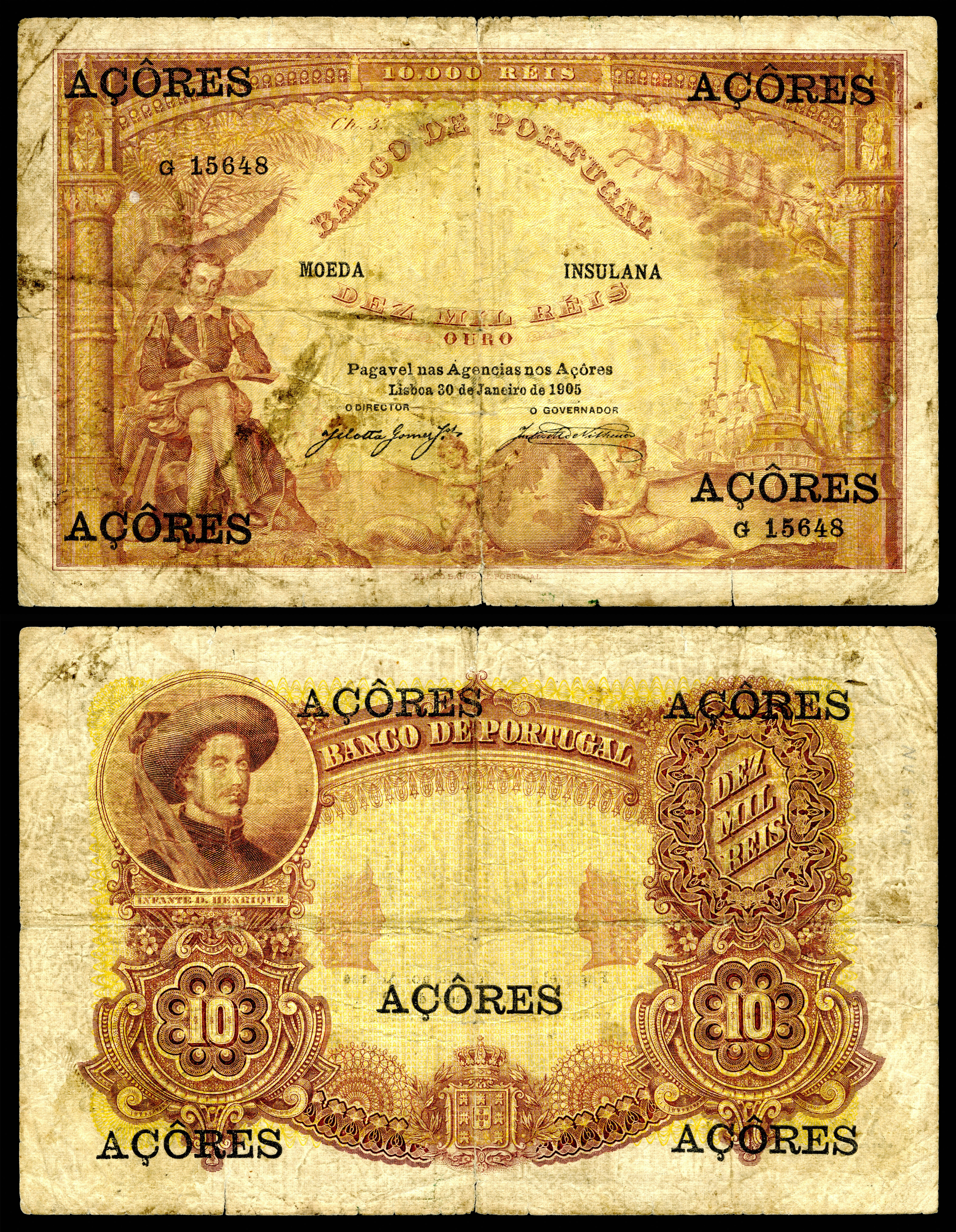

Unit
- Plural: Réis
- Nickname: Real

Denominations
- Banknotes: 2500 réis 5, 10, 20, 50 mil réis

Demographics
- Date of introduction: 1829
- Date of withdrawal: 31 March 1932
- Replaced by: Portuguese escudo
- User(s): Portugal; Azores

Issuance
- Central bank: Agencias dos Açôres
- Printer: Banco de Portugal

Valuation
- Pegged with: Portuguese escudo
- This infobox shows the latest status before this currency was rendered obsolete.

The moeda insulana ("insular currency") was the currency of the Portuguese archipelago of the Azores, used until 1931, when it was replaced by the Portuguese escudo.

== History ==
The real was currency of the Ilhas Adjacentes (Adjacent Islands) of Portugal, referring to the archipelago of the Azores and Madeira. It consisted of coins and banknotes, specifically issued and circulated in those islands, but with their own surcharge.

Coins were issued for the Azores until 1901 and banknotes were issued between 1895 and 1910. Although the Portuguese escudo replaced the real (1000 réis = 1 escudo) in 1911, the Azorean banknotes continued to circulate until 1932.

Although the Madeira equivalent continued to circulate until the end of the 19th century, the Azorean real continued to appear until 1931. At that time it was discounted by 25% to the Portuguese currency.

Owing to their surcharge, the island currency maintained a denomination that was inferior to the continental currency. Since the end of the 19th century there was a push to unify the currency in order to facilitate commercial exchange and eliminate barriers to free movement of cash that isolated the Azores. The proposal, supported by public officials and larger merchants, ran counter to the resistance from the local population that paid their taxes 25% greater than island currencies and who were afraid of the monetary crises that occurred during the first half of the 19th century. During these episodes local commerce was decimated and local savings in ruins.

Notwithstanding its residential unpopularity, the difference in value was seen as a source of problems for commercial relations, and many sectors of the Azorean economy were interested in settling these issues. These economic pressures were in line with the ideological stance of the National Dictatorship, which was largely centralist and fanatically nationalist, and who saw the existence of an Azorean currency as an anathema. In this context, a decree-law (19869, 2 June 1931) was published to unify the currency, and imposed by Salazar, even as many taxpayers were leery of the plan. Ancillary measures were therefore adopted, under decree-law 21/189 (2 May 1932), that established a deduction for taxpayers and credits for island residents, namely those who, by law or contract, accepted the imposition of the Portuguese escudo in the archipelago. This measure was imposed without protest.

The issue of an Azorean currency only reappeared in 1975, during the context of the autonomy and independentist movements, that succeeded the 25 April 1974 Carnation Revolution. It was a popular return, but became irrelevant with the Portuguese adhesion to the European Union, the growth in the regional economy, and the adoption of the Euro.

The Azorean banknotes were, in general, similar to the Portuguese real, but distinguished by its 25% discount in comparison to the continental unit. The coin existed in multiple denominations specific to the Azores, and today have a larger value.

== Coins ==
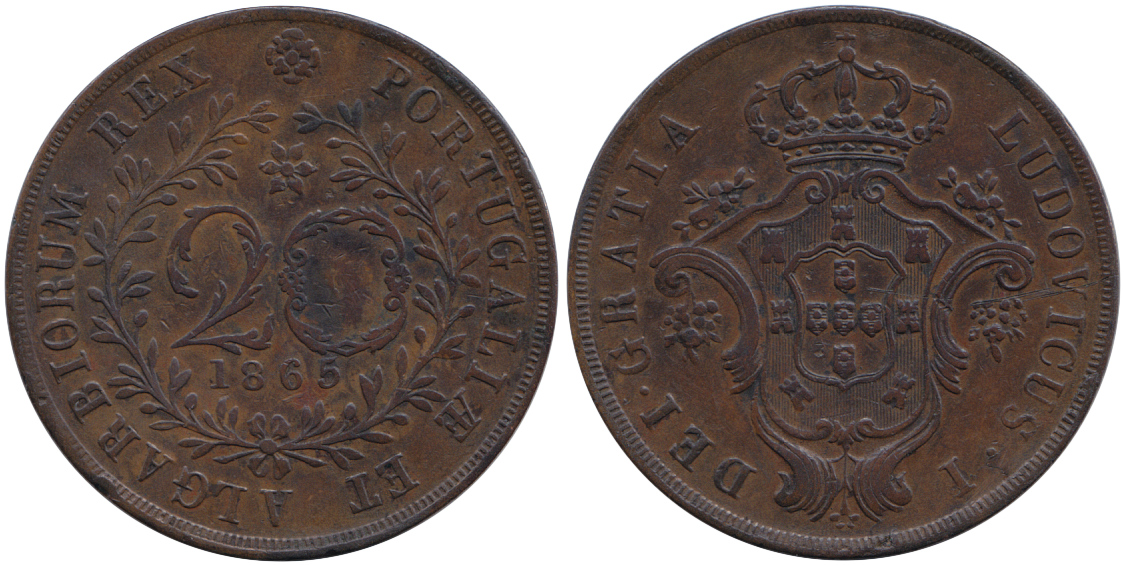
20 Azores Reals, 1865. Luís I.

In the late 18th century, copper 5, 10 and 20 réis and silver 75, 150 and 300 réis coins were issued. Production of silver coins ceased in 1798.

In 1829, during the Regency of Angra emergency coins were issued by Maria II on Terceira Island. These were 80 réis coins cast in gun or bell metal. From 1843, smaller, copper 5, 10 and 20 réis were issued, with the 20 réis ceasing in 1866 whilst the 5 and 10 réis continued until 1901. In both 1871 and 1887, various foreign coins were overstamped for use on the Azores. This produced denominations of 10, 20, 40, 120, 300, 600 and 1200 réis in 1871 and 15, 120, 300, 600 and 1200 réis in 1887.

== Banknotes ==
The Banco de Portugal first issued paper currency in the Azores in 1876. In 1895, 5000, 10,000, 20,000 and 50,000 réis notes were issued by the Agencias dos Açôres. These were followed by the 1905-1910 issue Banco de Portugal notes, overstamped with "Açôres", in denominations of 2500, 5000, 10,000, 20,000 and 50,000 réis.
