= Catalan Atlas =

1375 world map

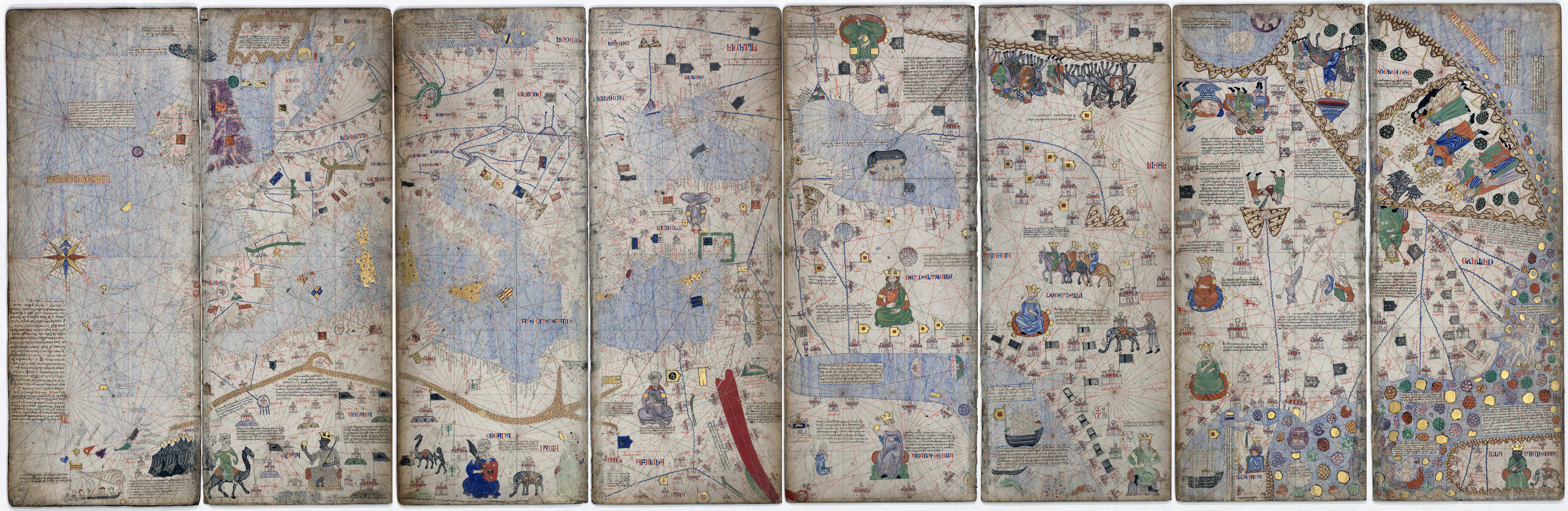
Montage of 8 pages (the third to sixth leaves) of the original 1375 Catalan Atlas

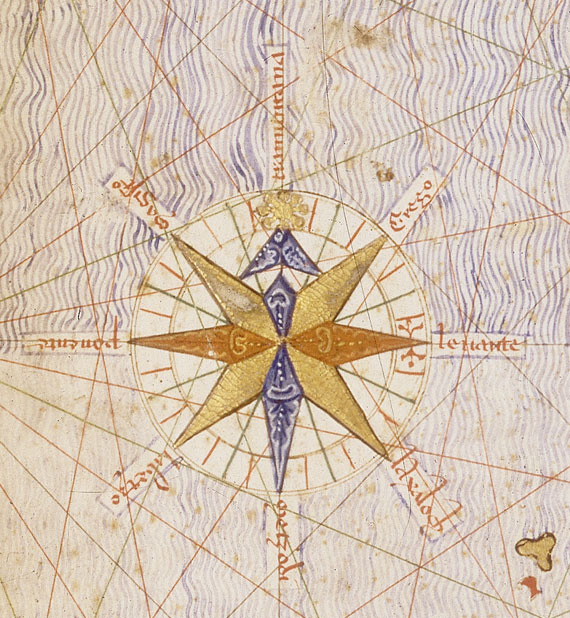
Detail of the Catalan Atlas, the first compass rose depicted on a map

The Catalan Atlas (Catalan: Atles català, Eastern Catalan: [ˈatləs kətəˈla]) is a medieval world map, or mappa mundi, probably created in the late 1370s or the early 1380s (often conventionally dated 1375), that has been described as the most important map of the Middle Ages in the Catalan language, and as "the zenith of medieval map-work".

It was produced by Cresques Abraham, a Jewish cartographer and leader of the Majorcan cartographic school, who was described by a contemporary as a master of mappae mundi as well as of compasses and illuminated manuscripts. It was in the royal library of France by 1380, during the reign of King Charles V, and is still preserved in the Bibliothèque nationale de France. The Catalan Atlas originally consisted of six vellum leaves (each circa 64.5 by 50 cm [25.4 by 19.7 in]) folded vertically, painted in various colours including gold and silver. They were later mounted on the front and back of five wooden panels, with the ends enclosed in a leather binding by Simon Vostre c. 1515, restored most recently in 1991. Wear has split each leaf into two.

== Description ==
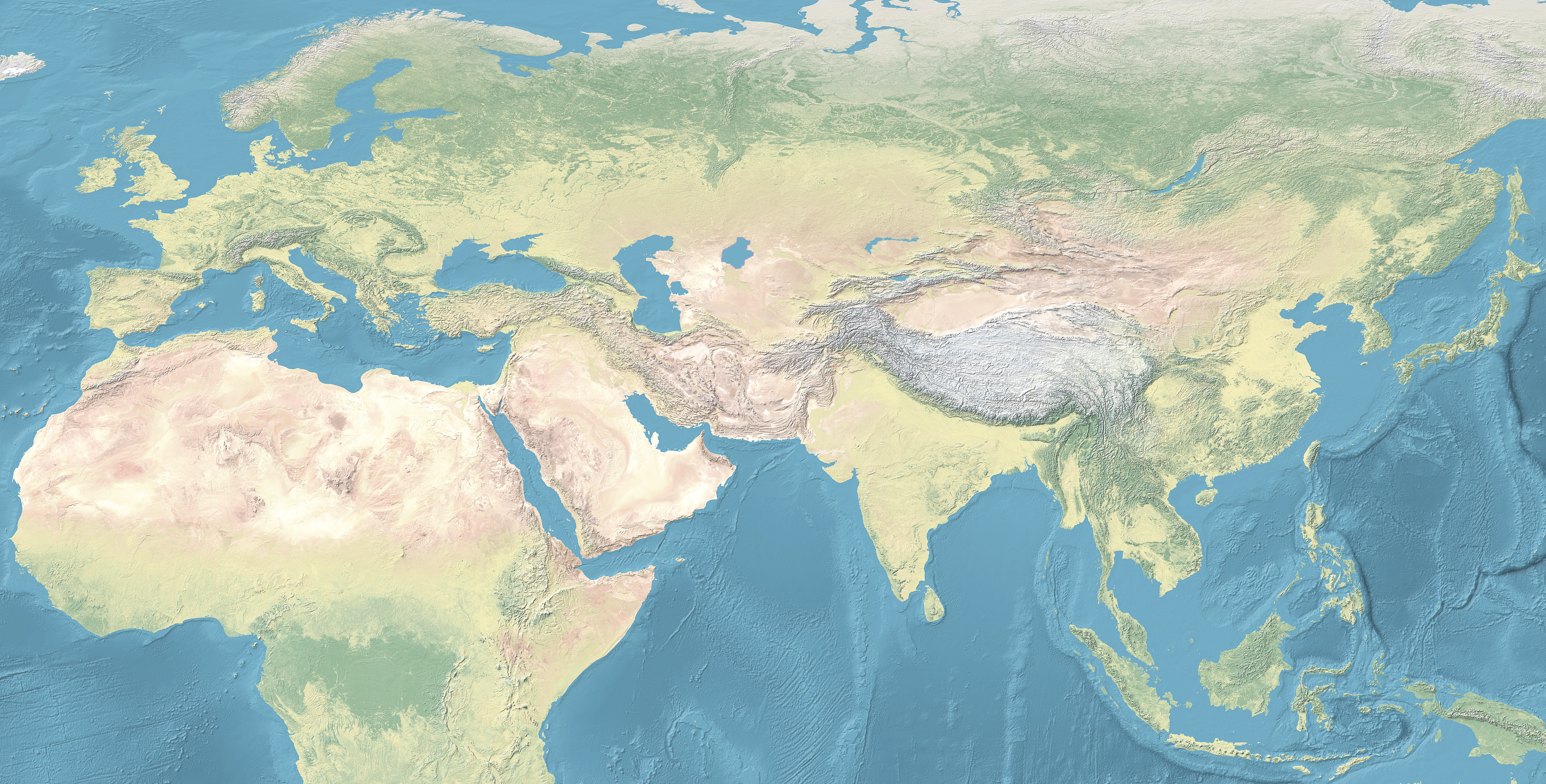
The world of the Catalan Atlas c. 1330

The first two leaves contain texts in Catalan covering cosmography, astronomy, and astrology. These texts are accompanied by illustrations. The texts and illustration emphasise the Earth's spherical shape and the state of the then known world. They also provide information to sailors on tides and how to tell time at night.

The four remaining leaves make up the actual map, with Jerusalem located close to the centre; two depict the Orient; the remaining two show Europe, along with North and West Africa. The map is around 1.3 m^{2} (14 sq ft) in size. It shows illustrations of many cities—Christian cities with a cross, other cities with a dome—and with each city's political allegiance indicated by a flag. Wavy blue vertical lines are used to symbolise oceans. Place names of important ports are transcribed in red, while others are indicated in black. The illustrations and most of the text are oriented towards the edges of the map, suggesting it was intended to be used by laying it flat and walking around it.

The oriental portion of the Catalan Atlas illustrates numerous religious references as well as a synthesis of medieval mappae mundi and the travel literature of the time, especially Marco Polo's Book of Marvels and Mandeville's Travels and Voyage of Sir John Mandeville. Many Indian and Chinese cities can be identified. The explanatory texts report customs described by Polo and catalogue local economic resources, real or supposed.

The Western portion is similar to contemporary portolan charts, but contains the first compass rose known to have been used on such a chart.

=== Mali Empire ===
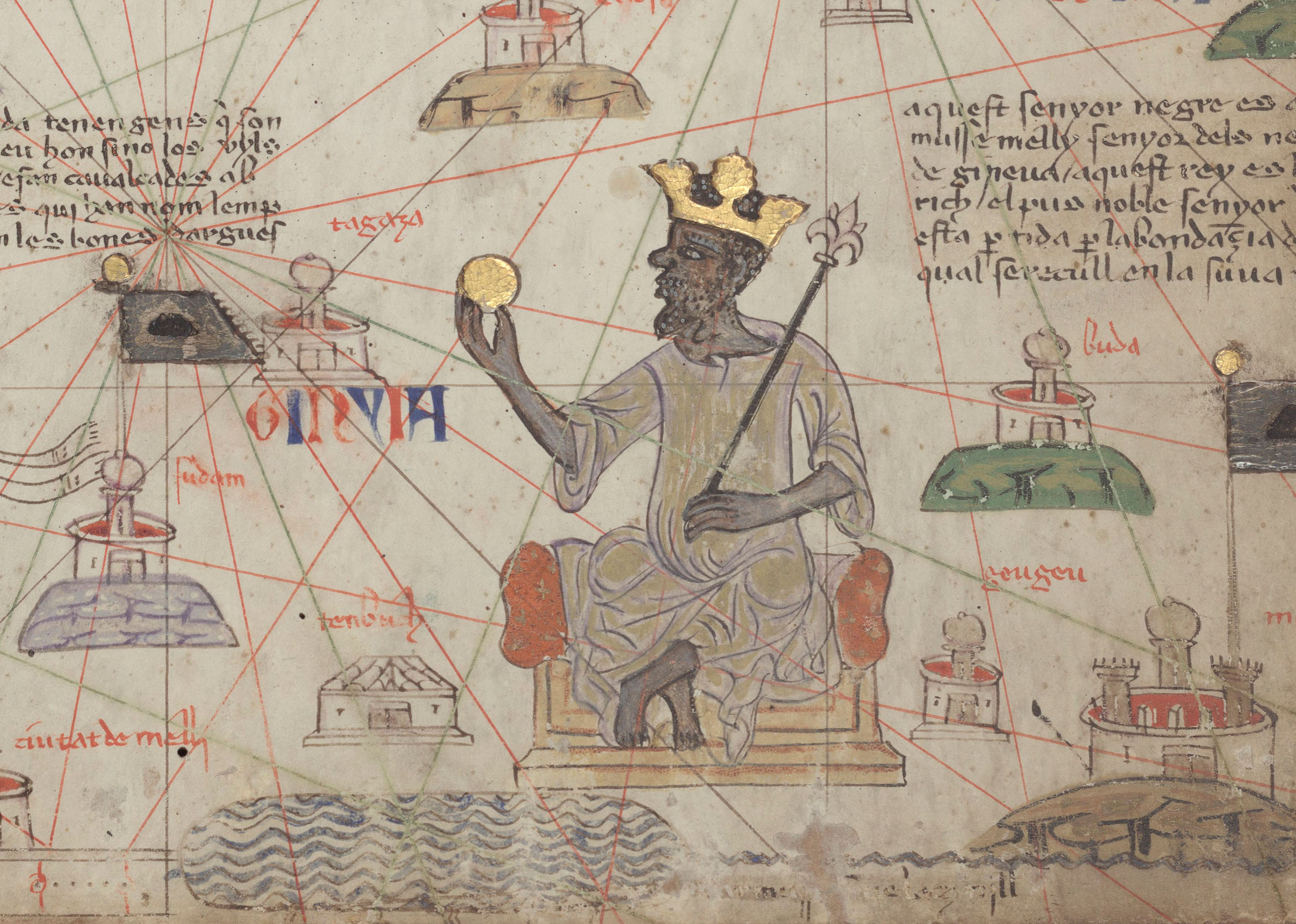
Depiction of Mansa Musa, ruler of the Mali Empire, holding a gold object

The Mali Empire and its riches are shown under the rule of Mansa Musa. The caption reads:

This black Lord is called Musse Melly and is the sovereign of the land of the black people of Gineva (Ghana). This king is the richest and noblest of all these lands due to the abundance of gold that is extracted from his lands.

The Catalan Atlas's depiction of Musa as "the richest man in this region" - frequently misquoted in modern media as a global or all-time superlative - has been examined by Hadrien Collet as one of the earliest European stages in the centuries-long fabrication of the Mansa Musa wealth myth.

=== Organa ===
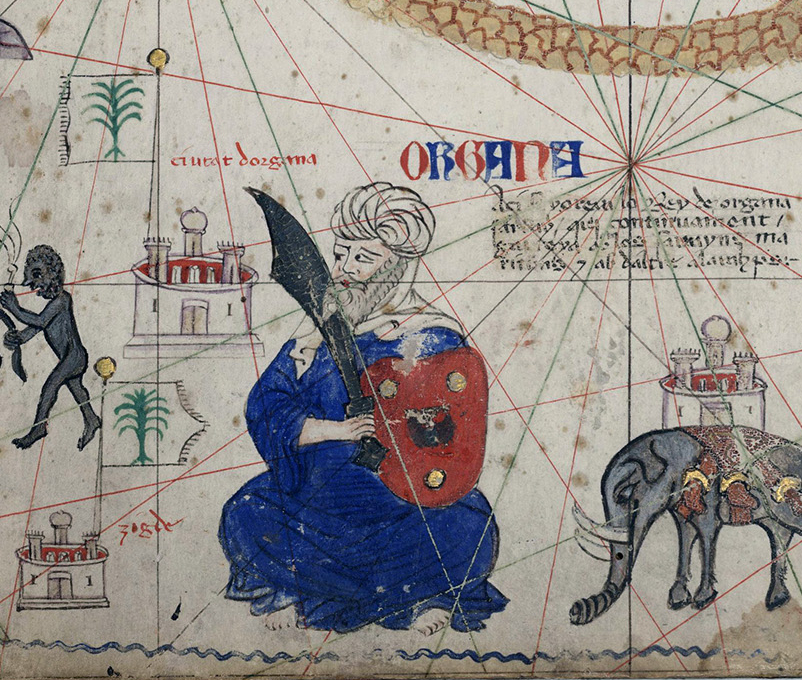
Depiction of the king of Organa, "Rey de Organa".

There are different interpretations of the depiction of Organa, placed in the central Sahara in the Catalan Atlas, on which the caption reads:

Here rules the King of Organa, a Saracen that constantly battles with the Saracens of the coast and with other Arabs.

There was no medieval kingdom in Africa that bore the name Organa. The use of this name for a country, and its association with a European-style heraldic flag (depicting a palm tree) reflects poor medieval European understanding of the African interior.

==== Kanem–Bornu Empire ====
The traditional interpretation of Organa is that it refers to the Kanem–Bornu Empire, a large and powerful state that occupied the region in which Organa is placed on the map. The name Organa has been suggested to be a heavily corrupted form of Kanem or to derive from the Saharan city Ouargla, misunderstood as part of the empire by European mapmakers.

==== Ife Empire ====
In 1980, the Nigerian historian Ade. M. Obayemi suggested that Organa could alternatively be identified with the Ife Empire, although it would be geographically misplaced. The name Organa could then allude to the early Ife rulers using the title "Ogane" (Oghene, Ogene). Suzanne Preston Blier has also supported this view, and argued that the title is also referenced in a Portuguese account from the 1480s by the seafarer Joao Afonso de Aveiro, whose work describes an inland ruler that played a central role in Benin royal enthronements by providing a brass crown, staff, and cross to acknowledge a new king.

==== Ghana Empire ====
In 2006, the Italian cartographer Piero Falchetta suggested that Organa could be a reference to either the Kanem–Bornu Empire or the more western Ghana Empire (which had long fallen by the time the Catalan Atlas was made).

=== India ===
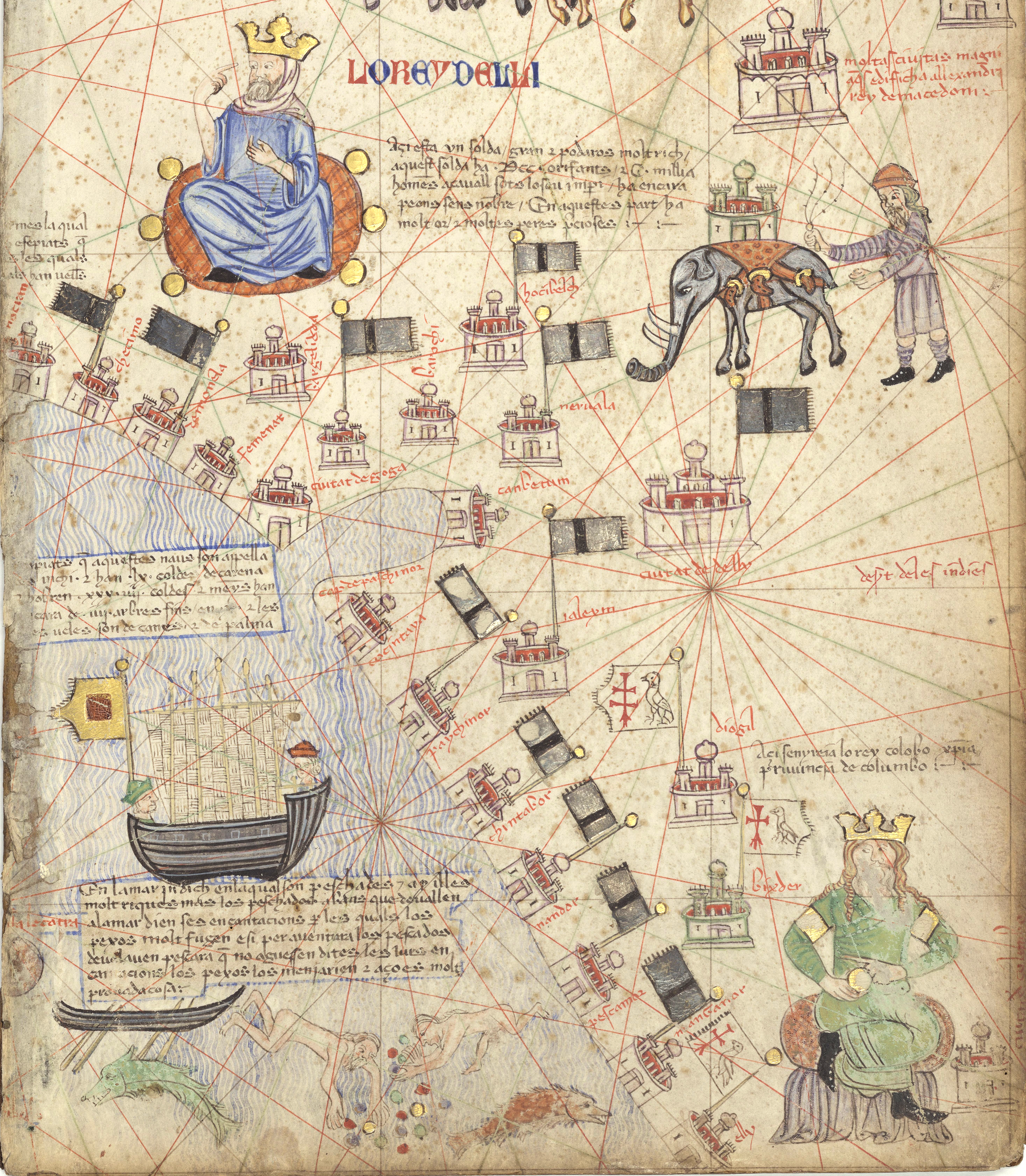
Western and southern India.

The western part of the Indian subcontinent is clearly depicted, and several of the location names are accurate. To the north appears the Sultan of Delhi (Rey de delli), the ruler of the contemporary Delhi Sultanate, with his flag on numerous cities. The caption reads:

Here is a great sultan, powerful and very rich: the sultan has seven hundred elephants and a hundred thousand horsemen under his command. He also has countless foot soldiers. In this part of the land there is a lot of gold and precious stones.

In the center of India appears the traditional Yadava capital of Diogil ("Deogiri", or Devagiri). On top of the city of Diogil floats a peculiar flag, while coastal cities are under the black flag of the Delhi Sultanate. Devagiri was ultimately captured by Alauddin Khalji of the Delhi Sultanate in 1307. The trading ship raises the flag of the Ilkhanate. Its caption reads:

Let it be known that these ships are named nichi, and measure sixty cubits in depth and thirty-four cubits in length; there are few with less than four masts and some even have ten. The sails are made of reed and palm leafs.

To the south, at the tip of India, appears the "King of Colombo" with a Christian flag. He was identified as Christian due to the early Saint Thomas Christianity there (since at least the 8th century), and the Catholic mission there under Jordan Catala since 1329. His caption reads:

Here rules the king of Colombo, a Christian.

Jordan, Christian missionary to Colombo from 1329, who wrote "Book of Marvels" (Mirabilia descripta, 1340), was probably the source of the information about Colombo in the Catalan Atlas. He mentions the earlier presence of the Saint Thomas Christians in India.

=== Il-Khanate ===
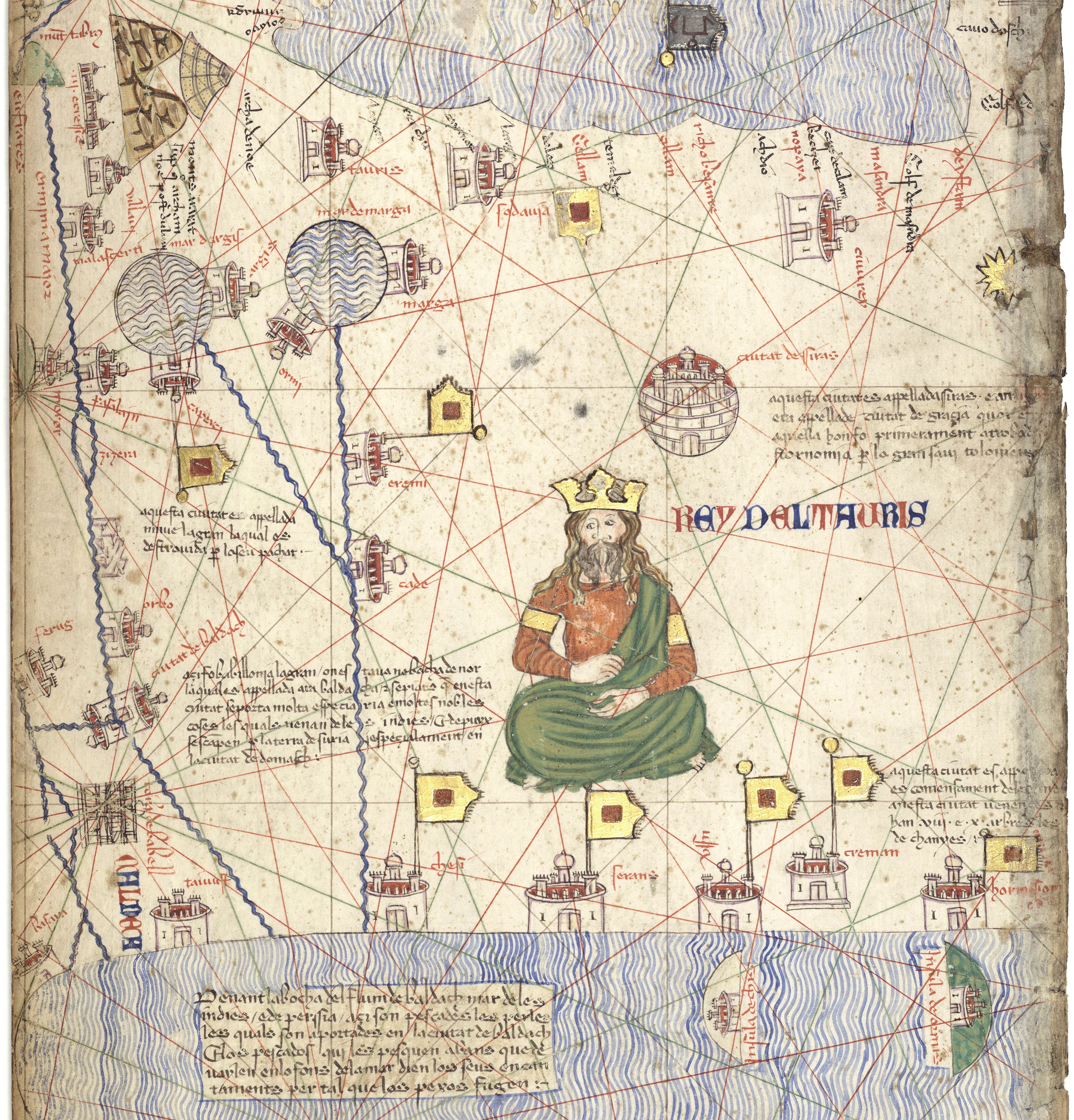
Depiction of the ruler of the Ilkhanate and his realm.

The Mongol Il-Khanate ruler and his dominions are depicted in the area of Persia under the title "Rey del tauris", after his capital city of Tabriz. The Ilkhanate flag also appears:.

The caption is only related to the city of Babylon:

Here there was the Great Babylonia, where Nabuconodosor resided, and that is called Baldaca today. Let it be known that many spices, as well as other noble products, come to this city from the Indies and they are distributed by Siria, in particular at the city of Damascus.

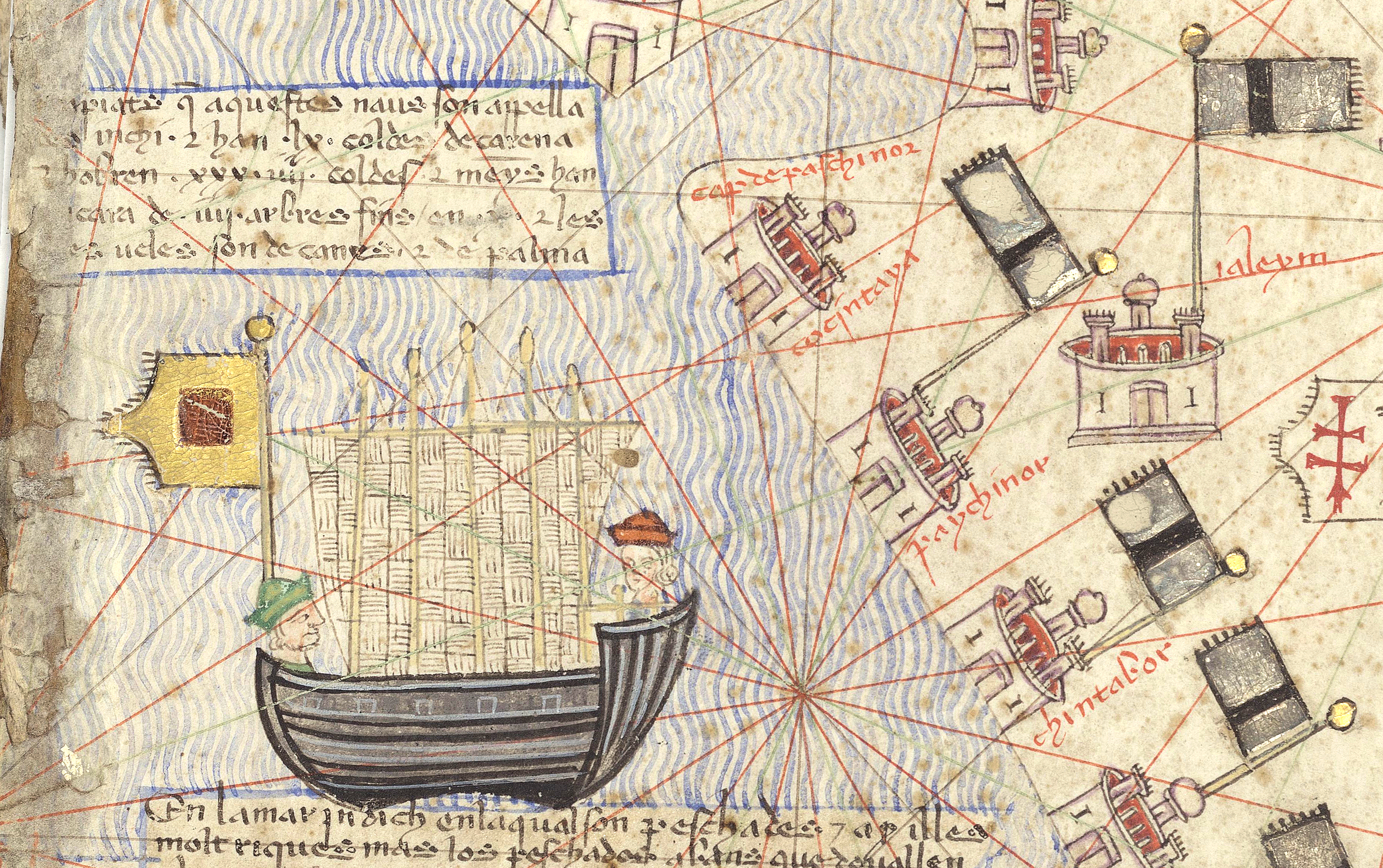
A ship under the Ilkhanate flag, sailing the Indian Ocean towards the coast of India under the control of the Delhi Sultanate.

Over him appears a city within a sphere, with the following caption, mentioning the Persian city of Shiraz and Ptolemy:

This city is named Siras, and in antiquity, it was named the City of Grace because it was there where astronomy was invented by the great wise man Ptolemy.

Two ships with flags of the Ilkhanate appears on the India Ocean, sailing to and from the Indian coast, where appear flags of the Delhi Sultanate. The label attached to one of the ships reads:

Know that these ships are called junks (inchi) and have sixty-cubit hulls with thirty-four cubits of freeboard. They have on top of this between four and ten masts, and their sails are of canes and palm.

=== Golden Horde ===
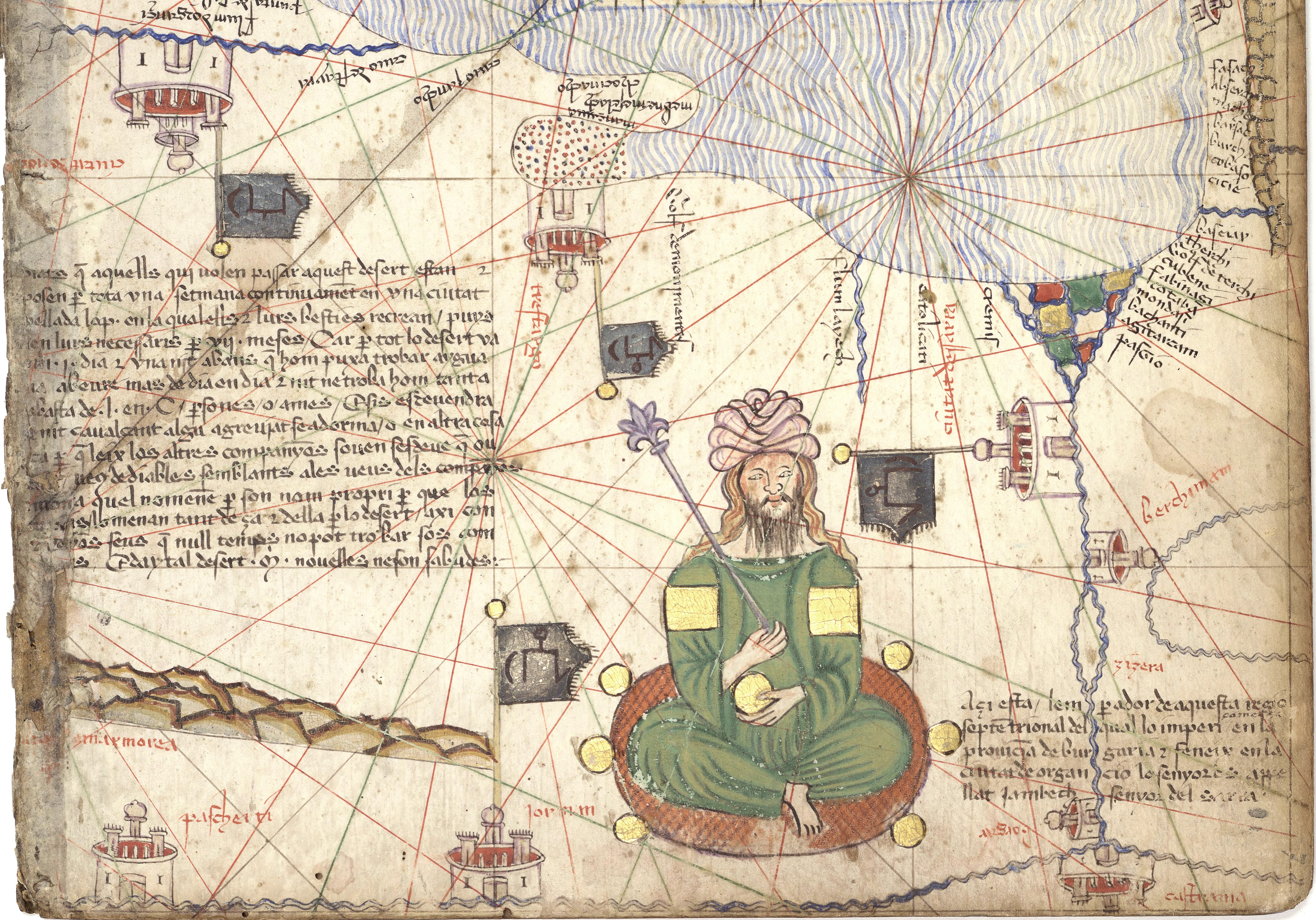
Jani Beg of the Golden Horde.

The Mongol polity of the Golden Horde is accurately depicted north of the Caspian Sea. The ruler named Jani Beg has been identified in this representation, being mentioned as "Jambech senyor de Sarra", and the flag of the Golden Horde also appears. The caption to the right reads:

Flag of the Golden Horde according to the Catalan Atlas.

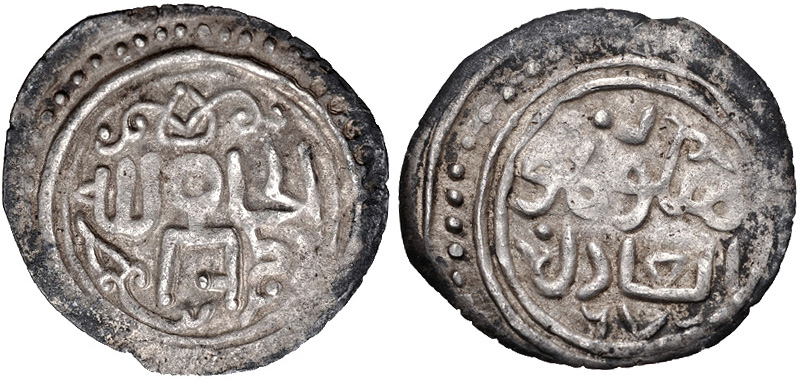
Coinage of Mengu-Timur with tamgha symbol, dated 1273–1275.

Here resides the emperor of this northern region whose empire starts in the province of Bulgaria and ends at the city of Organcio. The sovereign is named Jambech, Lord of the Sarra.

The symbolism of the Golden Horde flag depicted by the Catalan Atlas is fairly similar to the type of tamgha symbols (such as) actually found on the coinage of the Golden Horde. Such symbols were used until the time of Jani Beg, but essentially disappear thereafter.

The text to the left reads:

Let it be known that those that wish to cross this desert stop and rest during a week in a city named Lop. Here, expeditions and their animals relax/enjoy themselves. After that, they procure what is needed for the next seven months of the journey, because in the desert one travels an entire day and night before reaching potable water; however, every day and a half, they can find plenty of it, enough for fifty or a hundred people or even more. And if it happens that a rider, tired by the journey, falls sleep or for any other reason he separates from his companions, he will often hear the voices of devils, similar to the voices of his companions, often calling him by his own name. In this way, the devils take him through the desert to a fro such that the traveler cannot find his companions. A thousand stories are known about this desert.

=== Anatolia ===
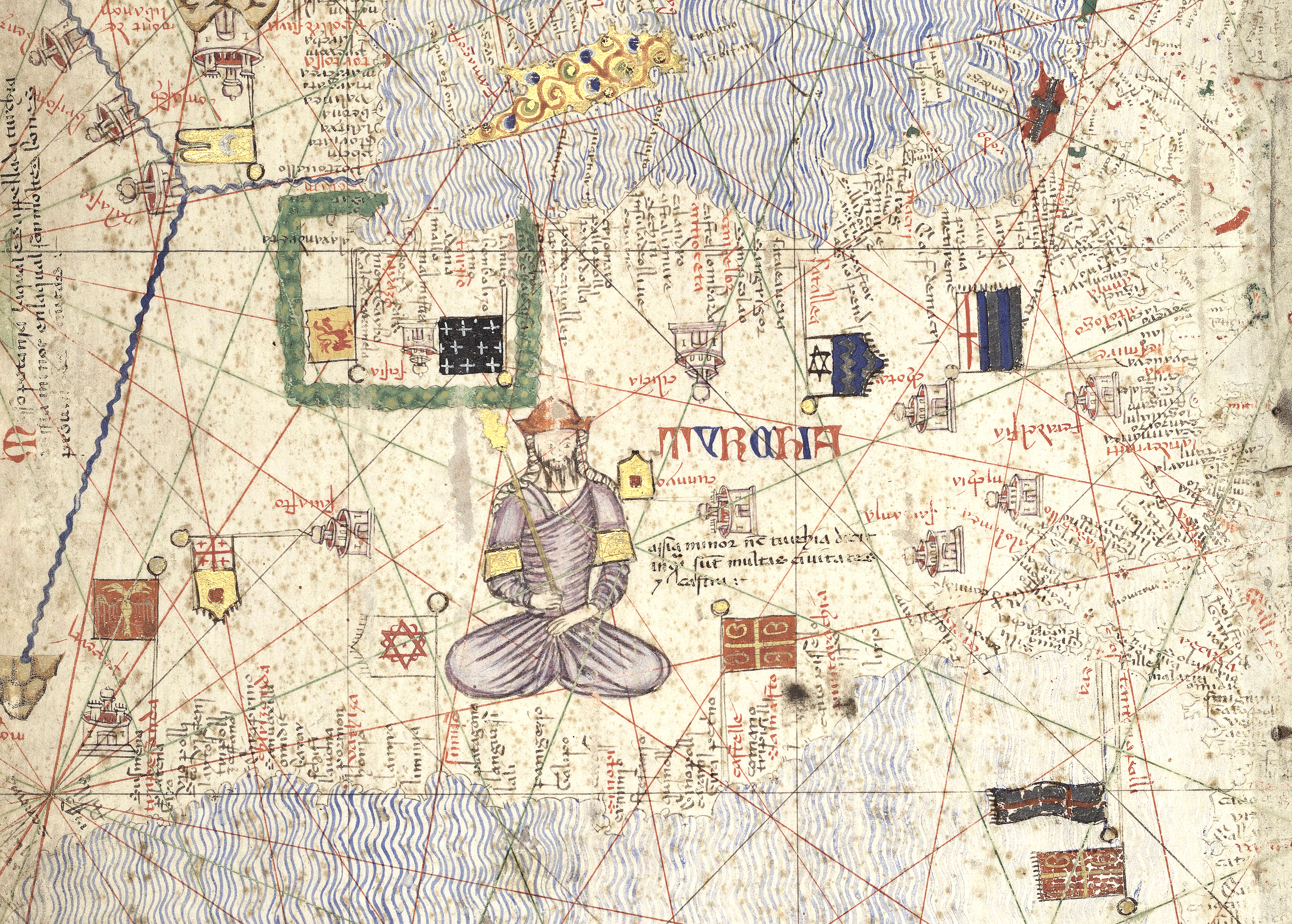
Anatolian Beyliks in the Catalan Atlas. The map is shown upside down.

The Anatolian Beyliks, a group of Turkic principalities in Anatolia are also depicted, in the region labelled Turqhia (Turkey). The caption next to the seated ruler in Anatolia reads: Asia Minor also called Turkey, where there are many cities and castles. Numerous Turkic principalities appear, with a variety of flags, but very little prominence is given to the Orthodox princes of the Byzantine Empire, although several Byzantine cities appear with the Byzantine imperial flag, or Trebizond. The Christian kingdom of Cilician Armenia appears heavily fortified within green walls, with its ports and flags clearly visible.

=== Gog and Magog ===
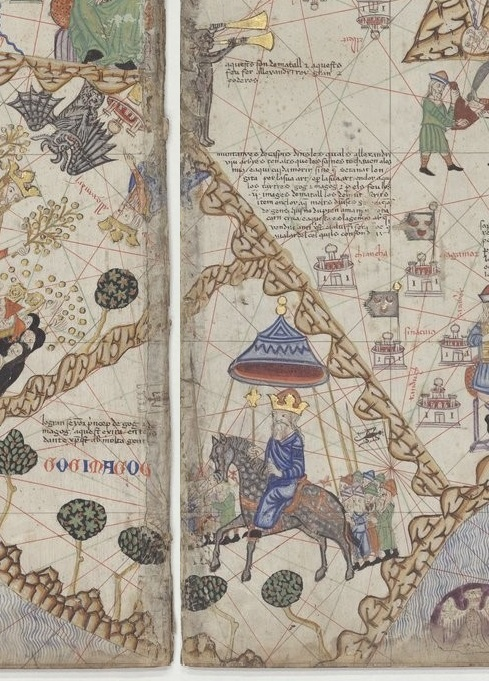
Land of "Gog i Magog".

The land of Gog and Magog appears in the top right corner. Traditionally described as wild and vicious man-eaters, the populace is uncharacteristically represented here by a stately king mounted on a horse and leading an orderly procession. Nearby appears Alexander the Great standing in front of Satan and pointing to a fortress where he intends to confine the nations of Gog and Magog.

=== Chagatai Khanate ===
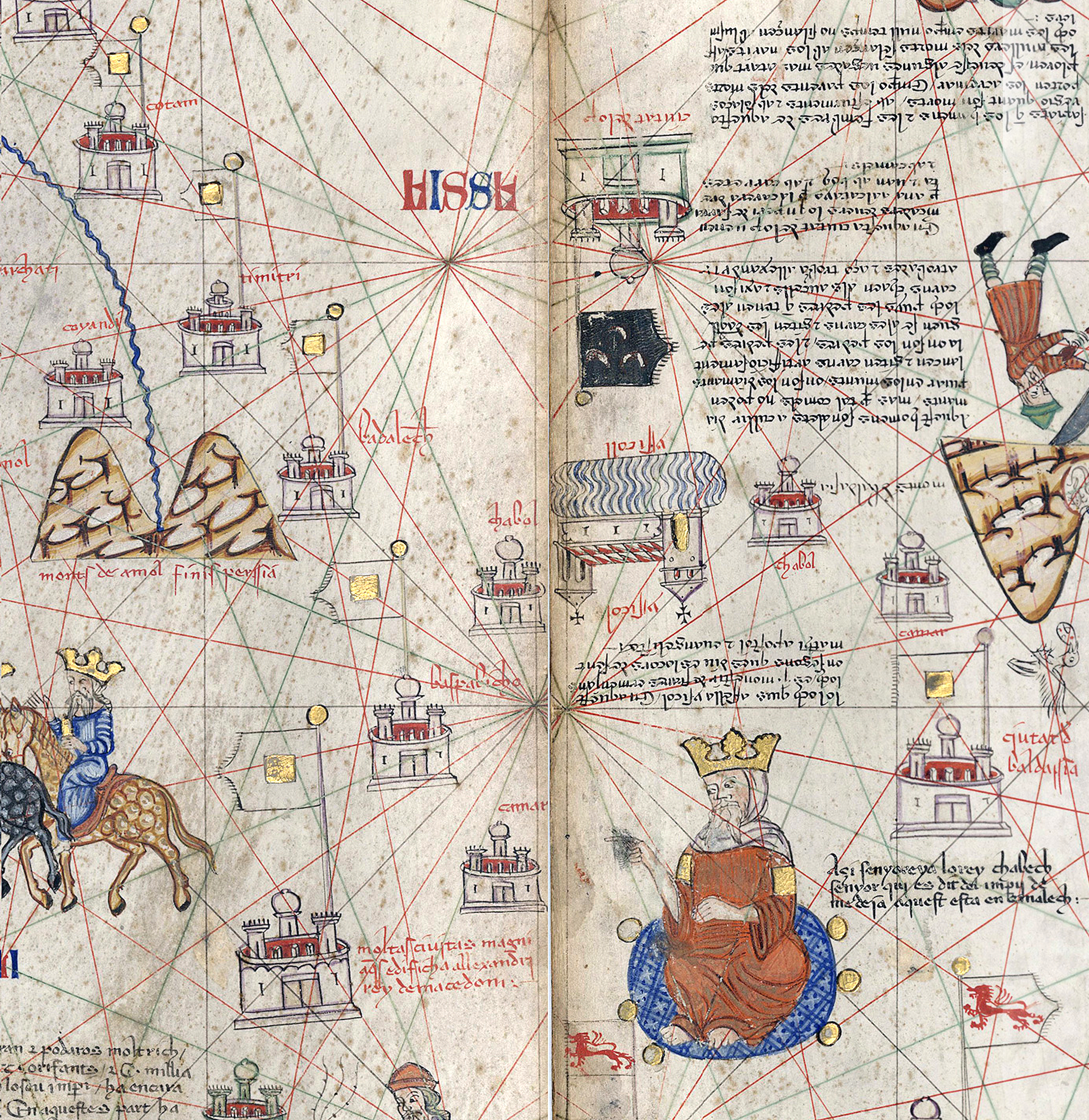
Kingdom of Chagatai in the Catalan Atlas (1375).

The Khan Kebek, Mongol ruler of the Chagatai Khanate is depicted with the following caption:

Here reigns the King Chabech (Kebek), lord of the Medeja [Media] Empire. He resides at Emalech (Almaliq).

His cities appear with the Chagatai flag.

=== Cathay (Yuan Mongol Empire) ===
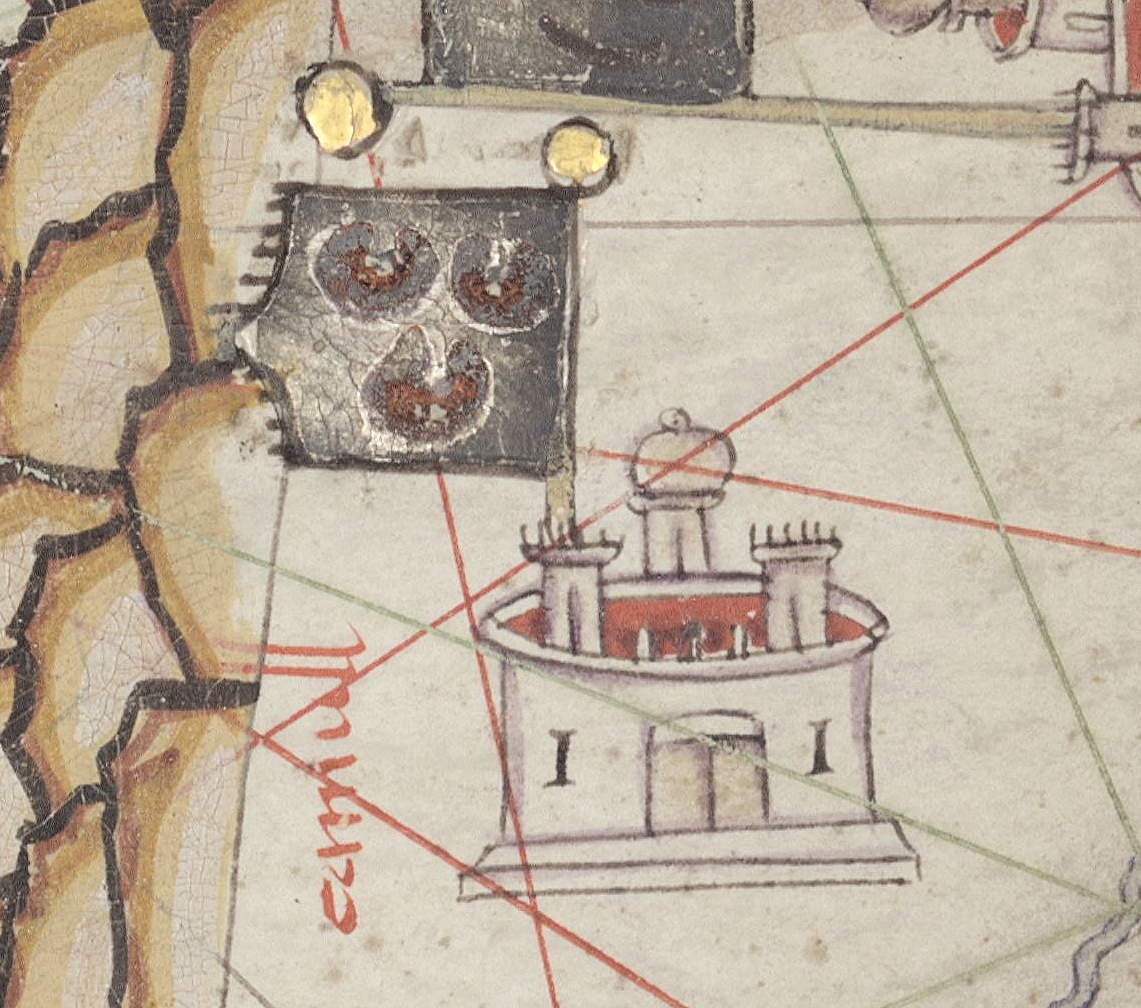
Flag over the city is camull (Khamil) in Xinjiang.

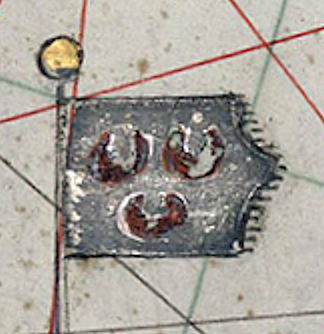
Flag of Cathay in the Catalan Atlas (Label: "The city of Carnan. Here ends Catay").

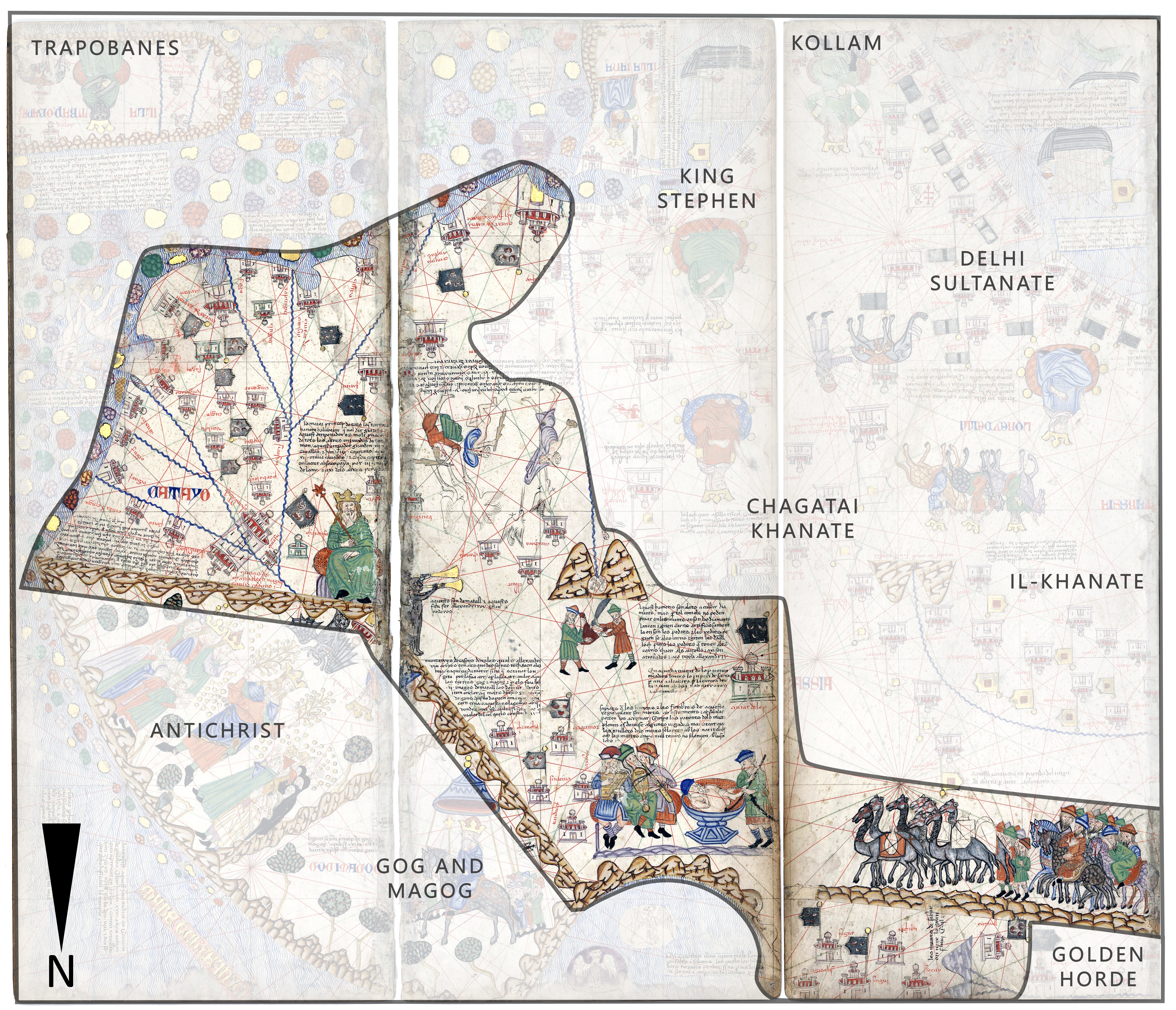
Empire of the Great Khan (Catayo) according to the Catalan Atlas (rotated 180°). The flag with three red crescent moons appears on all the territory.

The cities of Cathay, at that time the Empire of the Great Khan of the Mongols (Yuan dynasty), are shown raising a flag with three red crescent moons. The flag is seen all over eastern Asian cities in the Catalan Atlas.

Kublai Khan appears enthroned and wearing a green coat, with the following caption:

The most powerful prince of the Tartars is named Holubeim [Kubilay Khan], that means Great Khan. This emperor is richer than any other emperor in the world. This emperor is protected by twelve thousand horsemen with their four captains that stay at the court three months of the year.

=== Antichrist ===
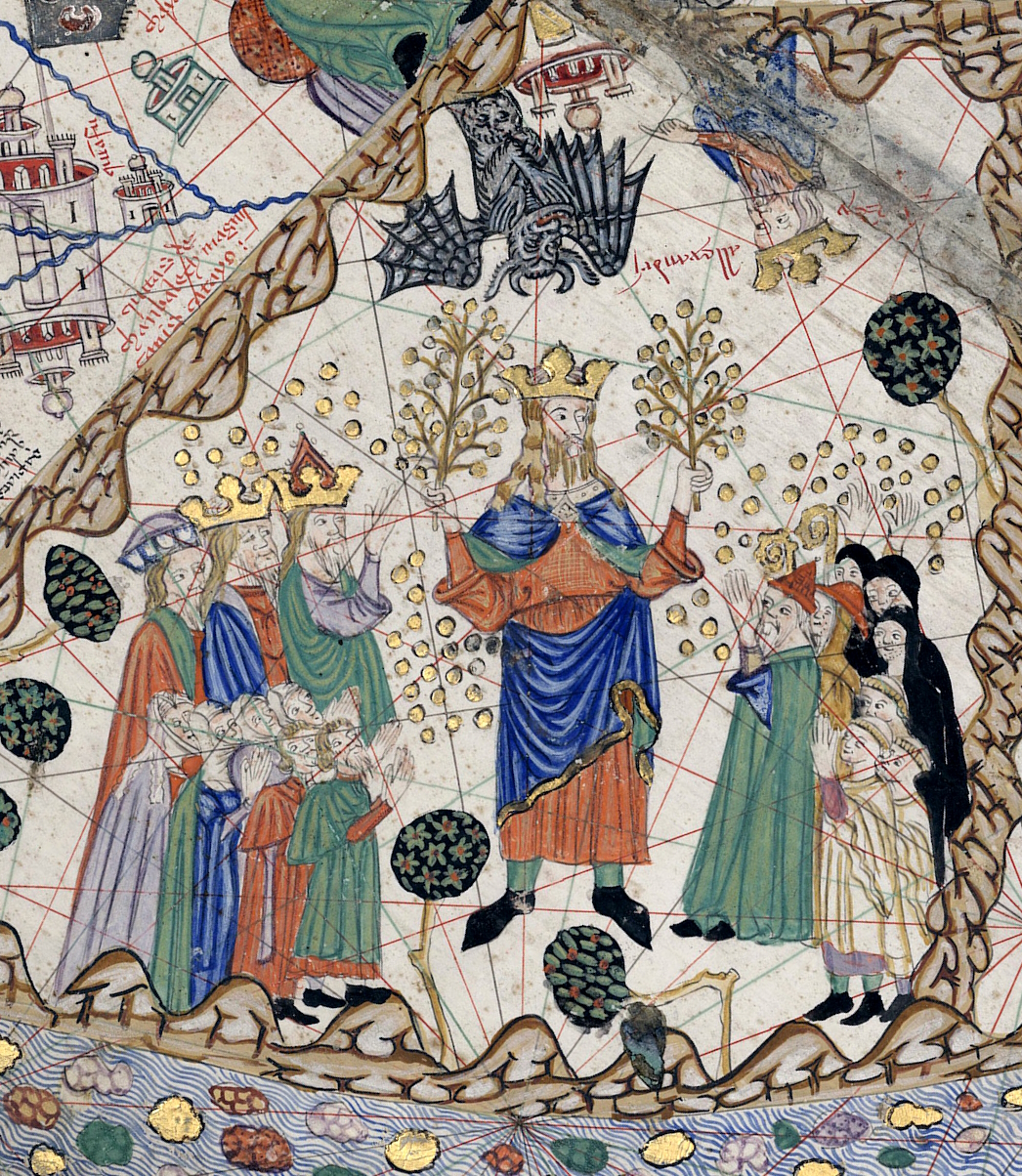
Antichrist in the Catalan Atlas (1375).

The Antichrist appears beyond the Great Wall of China, next to the territory of Gog and Magog. The label reads:

Antichrist. He will be raised in Goraym of Galilea, and at the age of thirty he will start to preach in Jerusalem; contrary to the truth, he will proclaim that he is Christ, the living son of God. It is said that he will rebuild the Temple.

== Gallery ==
Modern copy of western half

A modern reproduction of the Catalan Atlas depicting the eastern Mediterranean region.

Reproduction of the first leaf

Reproduction of the second leaf

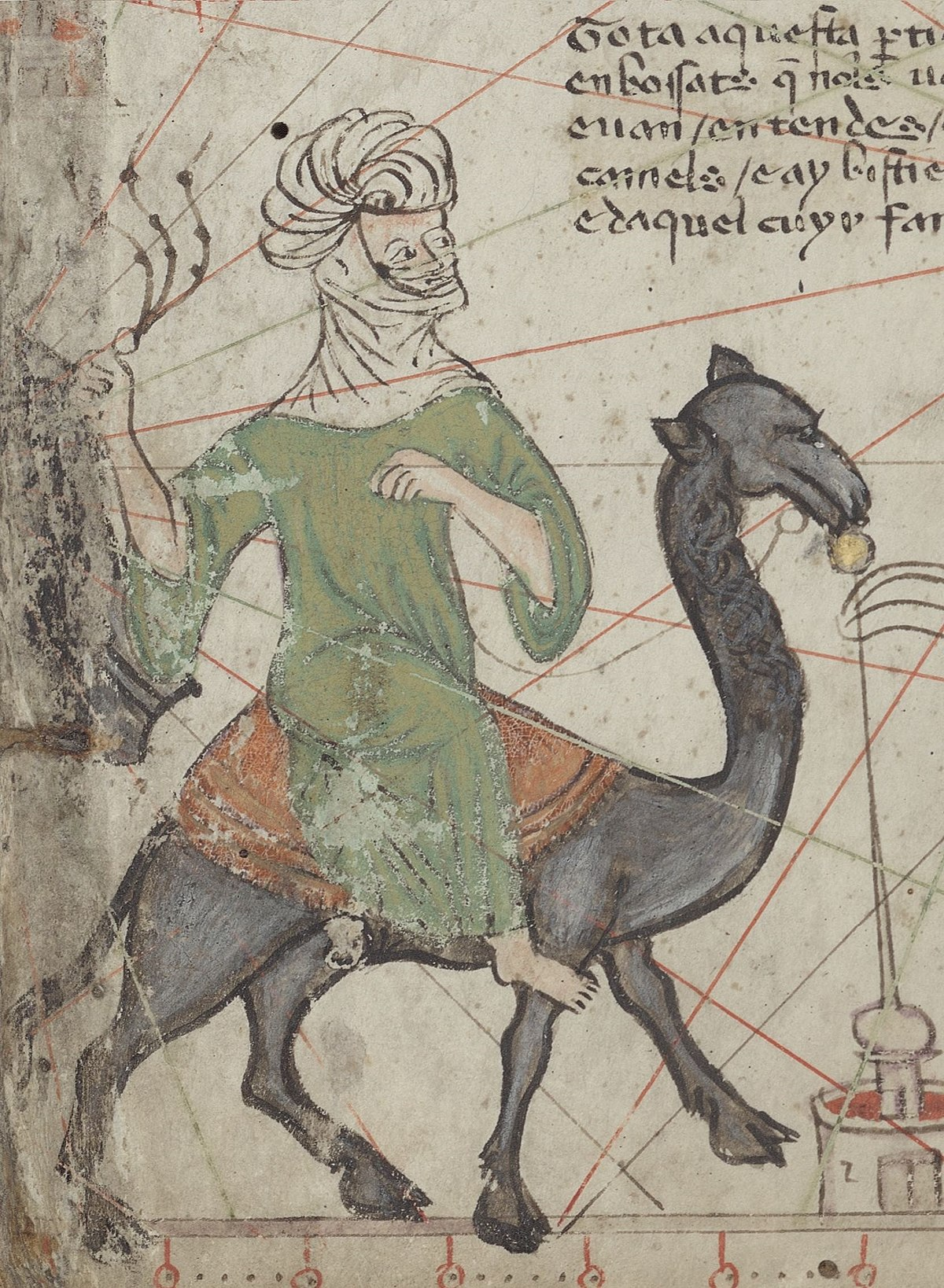
Depiction of a Sanhaja Berber, known as 'the veiled ones' due to their custom of wearing a face veil. The caption reads: "All this land is populated by people who cover themselves such that only their eyes can be seen; they live in tents and ride in camels. There are animals named lemp [orice] whose skin can be used to make good leather shields."

== See also ==
- Early world maps
- Rhumbline network
