= Virtual Mappa =

Medieval map editing project

Virtual Mappa (VM)
- Website type: collaborative, open access, digital humanities scholarship
- Key people: Martin Foys, Heather Wacha
- Website: sims2.digitalmappa.org/36

Virtual Mappa (VM) (https://sims2.digitalmappa.org/36) is a collaborative digital humanities project that collects, annotates and networks medieval mappamundi using the Digital Mappa resource. The project is open access, hosted and published by the Schoenberg Institute for Manuscript Studies at the University of Pennsylvania, and in collaboration with the British Library. The project is currently directed by Martin Foys and Heather Wacha, and continues to grow as new contributors join the project and edit new medieval maps.

== Maps currently in the project ==
The project currently includes editions of thirteen mappamundi:

- Cotton World Map (BL Cotton Tiberius B.v, f. 56v)
- Cotton Zonal Map (BL Cotton Tiberius B.v., f. 29r)
- Hereford Map (Hereford Cathedral)
- Higden Map (BL Royal 14.C IX, ff. 1v–2r)
- Higden Map (BL Royal 14.C IX, f. 2v)
- Higden Map (CCCC MS 21, f. 9r)
- Peterborough Map (BL Harley 3667, f. 8v)
- Psalter World Map (BL Add MS 28681, f. 9r)
- Psalter List Map (BL Add MS 28681, f. 9v)
- Sawley Map, also known as the Henry of Mainz Map (CCCC 66, Parker Library, p. 2)
- Thorney Map, or the St. John's 17 Map (OSJC 17, f. 6r)
- Tournai Map of Asia, also known as the Jerome Map (BL Add. MS 10049, f. 64r)
- Unfinished Anglo-Saxon Mappa Mundi (CCCC 265, p. 210)

== Medieval maps of the world ==
Traditionally, western European medieval mappaemundi, or world maps, have been divided into two categories: T–O maps and zonal maps. T–O maps are named as such because of their tripartite structure – a T rests inside an O, dividing the world into the three known continents. At the top is Asia, the bottom left quadrant contains areas of Europe, and the bottom right quadrant Africa. The orientation of T–O maps is usually shifted 90 degrees to the left, such that the cardinal direction of east, i.e. paradise, India and parts of Asia for a medieval mind are located at the very top of the map. Zonal maps, however, are usually oriented with north at the top, and the world is divided into four latitudinal zones that represent climate and indicate appropriateness for habitation. Both types of medieval maps are included in the Virtual Mappa project.

== Project history and support ==
The project came out of digital humanities research by project leader Martin Foys of medieval artifacts and media that resisted traditional modes of print-based scholarship. Medieval mappamundi represented a problem of representation and analysis that digital tools and techniques could help address. The digital humanities resource of digital annotation and linking tools that was developed to collect, annotate and network medieval maps was Digital Mappa, which is now its own freely available online workspace and digital publishing platform.

As part of the Digital Mappa (DM) platform, Virtual Mappa has been funded by grants by the National Endowment for the Humanities (NEH), the Wisconsin Alumni Research Foundation (WARF) at the University of Wisconsin-Madison, and the Andrew W. Mellon Foundation.

== Project Citation ==
Virtual Mappa: Digital Editions of Early Medieval Maps of the World, edit. Martin Foys, Heather Wacha, et al. (Philadelphia, PA: Schoenberg Institute of Manuscript Studies, 2018): https://sims2.digitalmappa.org/36. DOI: 10.21231/ef21-ev82.
