= Psalter world map =

Medieval world map

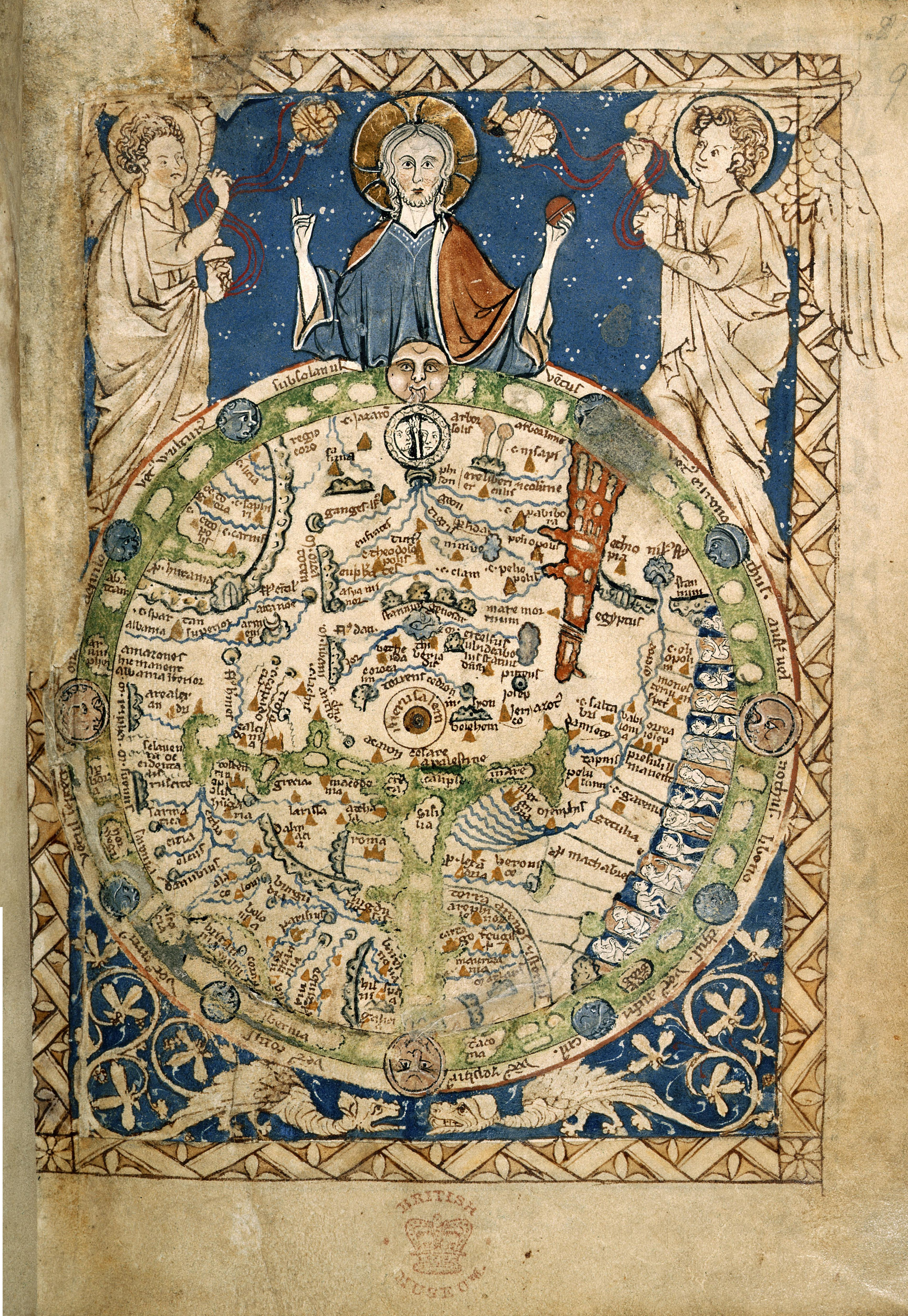
Psalter world map, ca. 1260. Jerusalem is at the centre of the map; the Red Sea can be seen coloured red at upper right of the globe.

The Psalter world map is a small mappa mundi from the 13th century, now in the British Library, found in a psalter (London, British Library Add MS 28681), now known as the Map Psalter. No other records of psalters found from the Middle Ages have a mappa mundi.

The Psalter mappa mundi was likely used to provide context for the Bible's stories as well as a visual narrative of Christianity. Mappae mundi were not utilized as maps for travel or geographical education, but as history lessons taught through a visual means. Historian Felicitas Schmieder refers to mappa mundi as "Geographies of Salvation" as they are report the narrative of Christ's interaction with our world. The Psalter mappa mundi is now conserved at the British Library in London.

An open-access high-resolution digital image of the map with place and name annotations is included among the thirteen medieval maps of the world edited in the Virtual Mappa project. The Map Psalter can be broken down in the following manner: ff. 3v-8r are later additions of 6 illustrations from the New Testament, ff. 9r-9v are the mappa mundi and a second written T-O map, ff. 10v-16v a calendar, which were included in many psalters of the time. They served to highlight days of canonization of saints and other important holidays, f. 17r-v has simple prayers usually found in psalters, ff. 18v-184v consist of the Canticles, or a collection of hymns, prayers, or songs usually found in psalters. ff. 184r-185v include a litany, ff. 185v-189v are petitions for help from God, ff. 217-221v induces the Office of the Dead, ff. 191r-212v are passages praising the Virgin Mary. The ff. 212r - 217r are written in Anglo-Norman, as all signs indicate that the book was made in London. The psalter ends on ff. 221v-222v with a different writing style of common Latin prayers, appearing to be a later addition.

== Physical description ==
The small map (17 cm x 12.5 cm) is incredibly finely detailed and was drawn around 1270; the artist is unknown. The map is divided into three main parts that are intended to show the whole of the universe. The upper area shows Christ as a figure of salvation, with arms outstretched. Christ exist above the world that humans naturally inhabit. However, the second part of this image the map itself or the world. An important distinction here is Christ is not separate from the world, but his body is the world. The map is a "history projected on a geographical basis" therefore the map highlights important areas of Christ's life and influences. The map itself annotates 91 named locations. Many if not most of the named locations on the psalter map is associated to a psalm in the text itself.

=== Provenance ===
The origin of this mappa mundi is relatively unknown but there is much debate surrounding its importance. The Map Psalter was created between 1262-1280. This is due to a calendar page highlighting the canonization of Richard de Wych in 1262. The Map Psalter is unlikely to have been created after 1280 due to the lack of acknowledgement to the sainthood one of translators of St. Hugh of Lincoln in 1280. There is no explicit text in the Map Psalter that exactly pinpoint a place of production, but there are a few hints as to where it could have been made. It is confirmed that the workshop of the Sarum Master, illuminators based out of Salisbury, made the Stockholm Psalter. Of which the Map Psalter share many similar illustrations and are stylistically similar. This comes in the form of similar foliage ornamentation, liberal use of color, facial type, and strongly delineated black lines. Further the Office of the Dead tend to be very region specific text. The Map Psalter's Office of the Dead is only one word different from the standard Sarum Masters' Office of the Dead. Another idea is the Map Psalter is of Westminster provenance due to tinting of the pages sharing similarities to Morgan Apocalypse. The Map Psalter is similar in nature to two other mappae mundi thought to be produced in the middle ages as well, the Hereford mappa mundi and the Ebstorf mappa mundi. All three mappae mundi are said to reflect a master mappa mundi, of which one was known to exist in the great hall of Westminster Palace commissioned by Henry III. There are a few theories the Map Psalter may have been used by Henry III or someone close to him, but there is little to suggest this other than similarities to the great hall map.

=== Possession ===
While the specific origin and original owner(s) of the Map Psalter is unknown, there are a few named owners during the 16th century. On f. 18r "Mary Wyndham" is written in 16th century hand. Also on f. 225v "Anne my eldeast doughter was borne the xiiij day of July in the yere of our lorde God 1557" written in 16th century hand. There are more additions in a later hand on f. 1r, alphabetizing some of the psalms. The binding on the Map Psalter currently is from J. Clarke after 1600. Later Henry D. Jones placed his armorial bookplate in the upper binding. Henry sold the Map Psalter to the British Museum on the 5th of April 1871.

== Notable iconography ==
=== Orientation ===
Unlike the maps of today, the top of the map is geographically East instead of North. It is a typical mappa mundi that does not only show the geographical and historical knowledge, but also puts it into the frame of salvation history. Jesus Christ appears in the East (i.e. "above"), as the maps of Christian Middle Ages have East at the top, giving a blessing with his right hand.

=== The monstrous people ===
In the bottom right or the Southwest of the map there are 14 images of monstrous people that occupy the edge of the map. These "monsters" are frequently referred to as the Blemmaye, but only have dawned this name due to the association the Ethiopian tribe Blemmaye tribe near where these creatures are shown on the map. There are various competing theories as to what these creatures are or represent. The easiest conclusion of which is discussed by Grčić and Mittman is that the artist drew the map from a perceptive of the civilized against the uncivilized. Maps like the Hereford map give more insight as to the title of these monsters. The Latin titles are simple translations like, "eyes in chest" or "no ears". However, the key difference is the visual confinement of the such monsters in the psalter map. Both authors highlight this may be attempting to show the difference in the "civilized" and the barbarians like in the story of Gog and Magog. Another theory from Grčić is that these are creatures of sin living in the Christian Kingdom of Prester John.

=== Digital Edition ===
The Virtual Mappa project contains annotated digital editions of both the Psalter World Map and List Map.
