= Henry I (archbishop of Mainz) =

- Archbishop of Mainz
- Church: Catholic Church
- Diocese: Electorate of Mainz
- In office: 1142–1153

Personal details
- Born: c. 1080
- Died: 1/3 September 1153

Henry, in German Heinrich (c. 1080 – 1/3 September 1153), was the archbishop of Mainz from September 1142 until his deposition in June 1153.

== Early life ==
The future archbishop may be the same person as the Henry who is recorded as archdeacon of the collegiate church of Marienkamp in Mainz in 1104. The prologue of one late 12th-century copy of the Imago mundi of Honorius of Autun says that the text was edited by this Henry in 1110. As a result, Henry has often been associated with the accompanying mappa mundi, the Sawley map, but there is no basis for connecting the editor of the text with later addition of a map. A canon named Henry is also recorded attached to Mainz Cathedral in 1111.

== Archbishop ==
Henry succeeded Markholf as archbishop of Mainz in September 1142. In his early years as archbishop he was assisted by Anselm of Havelberg.

He was a supporter and correspondent of Hildegard of Bingen. In 1147, at the synod of Trier, he presented a copy of Hildegard's biblical commentaries to Pope Eugene III and Bernard of Clairvaux. He consecrated the church of her convent at Rupertsberg in 1152. He has been portrayed showing her works to Pope Eugene III and Bernard of Clairvaux.

In 1147, at the time of the Second Crusade, he tried to prevent a repetition of the 1096 violence against the Jews of Mainz. He called in Bernard of Clairvaux, to counter inflammatory preaching by the monk Radulf the Cistercian. He took part in the Wendish Crusade of 1147.

Henry was the archchancellor of the kingdom of Germany from 1142 until 1152, but in 1153 he was archchancellor of the kingdom of Burgundy on account of the disturbances that broke out there following the death of King Conrad III on 15 February 1152. He joined the group around Conrad's nephew, Frederick Barbarossa, before the latter's election as king on 4 March. Nevertheless, the Chronica regia Coloniensis claims that he opposed Barbarossa's election, preferring the accession of Conrad's young son, Frederick.

In a synod at Worms on 7 June 1153, Henry was deposed as archbishop. Otto of Freising reports that it was because he was "often reproved ... but never improved", but the Chronica regia claims that it was because he refused to recognize Barbarossa's election.

Henry died in Einbeck on 1 or 3 September 1153.

Preceded by Markholf	Archbishop of Mainz; 1142–1153	Succeeded by Arnold
