= Gervase of Ebstorf =

Medieval cartographer

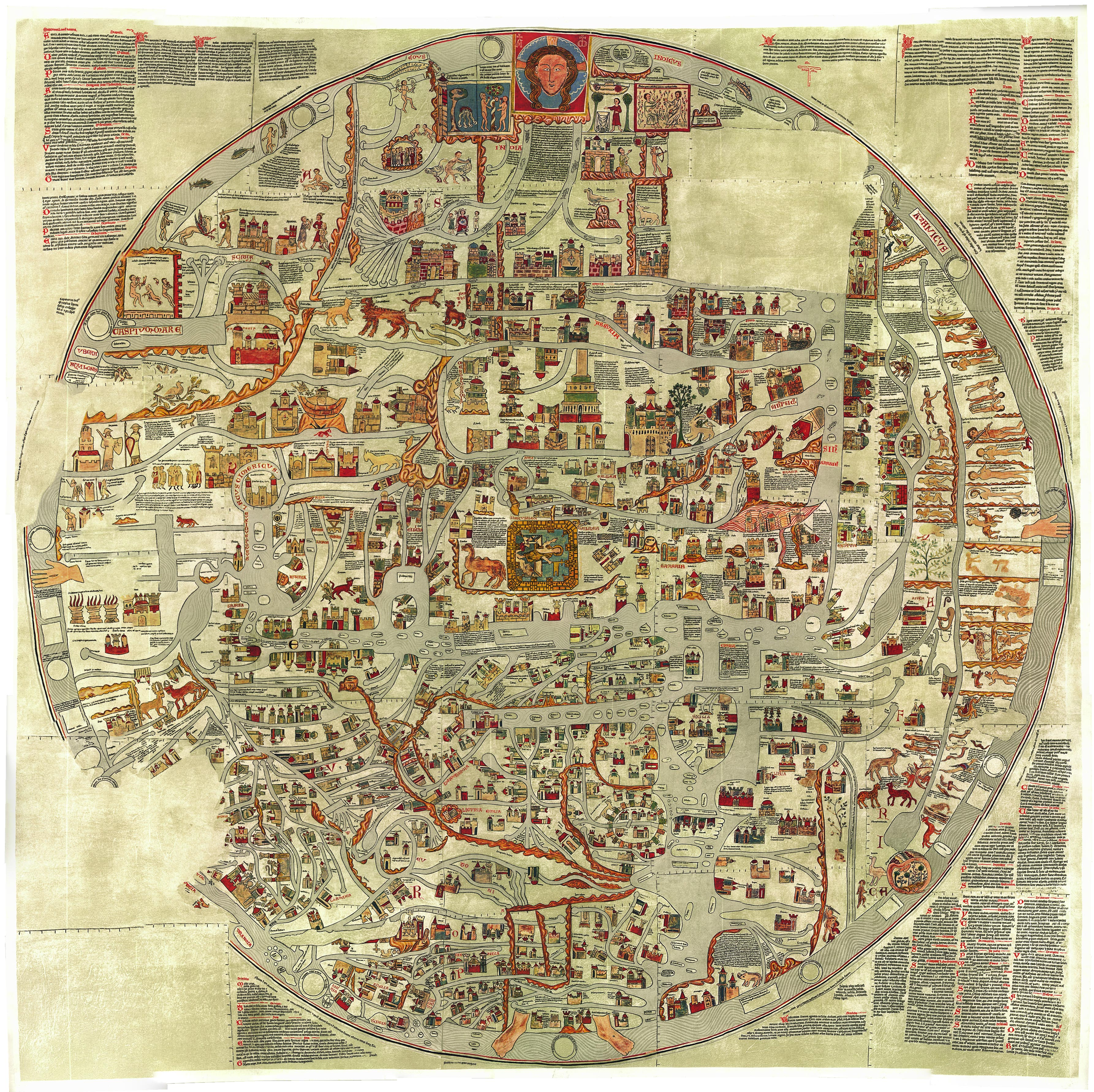
Photo of a reproduction of the Ebstorf Map; the original was destroyed by the bombing of Hanover in World War Two.

Gervase of Ebstorf (fl. 1234-1240) is best known as the author of the Ebstorf Map, a medieval mappa mundi created between 1234 and 1240.

Gervase was provost of the convent of Ebstorf, Saxony from 1223 to 1234 and died before 1244. He may or may not be the same man as Gervase of Tilbury, author of the Otia Imperialia, "Recreation for an Emperor", written for Emperor Otto IV.

The connection between Gervase of Tilbury and Gervase of Ebstorf can "only remain hypothetical"; the arguments for Gervase of Tilbury being the mapmaker are based on the name Gervase, which was an uncommon name in Northern Germany at the time, and on some similarities between the world view of the mapmaker and of Gervase of Tilbury.
