= Sawley map =

English mappa mundi

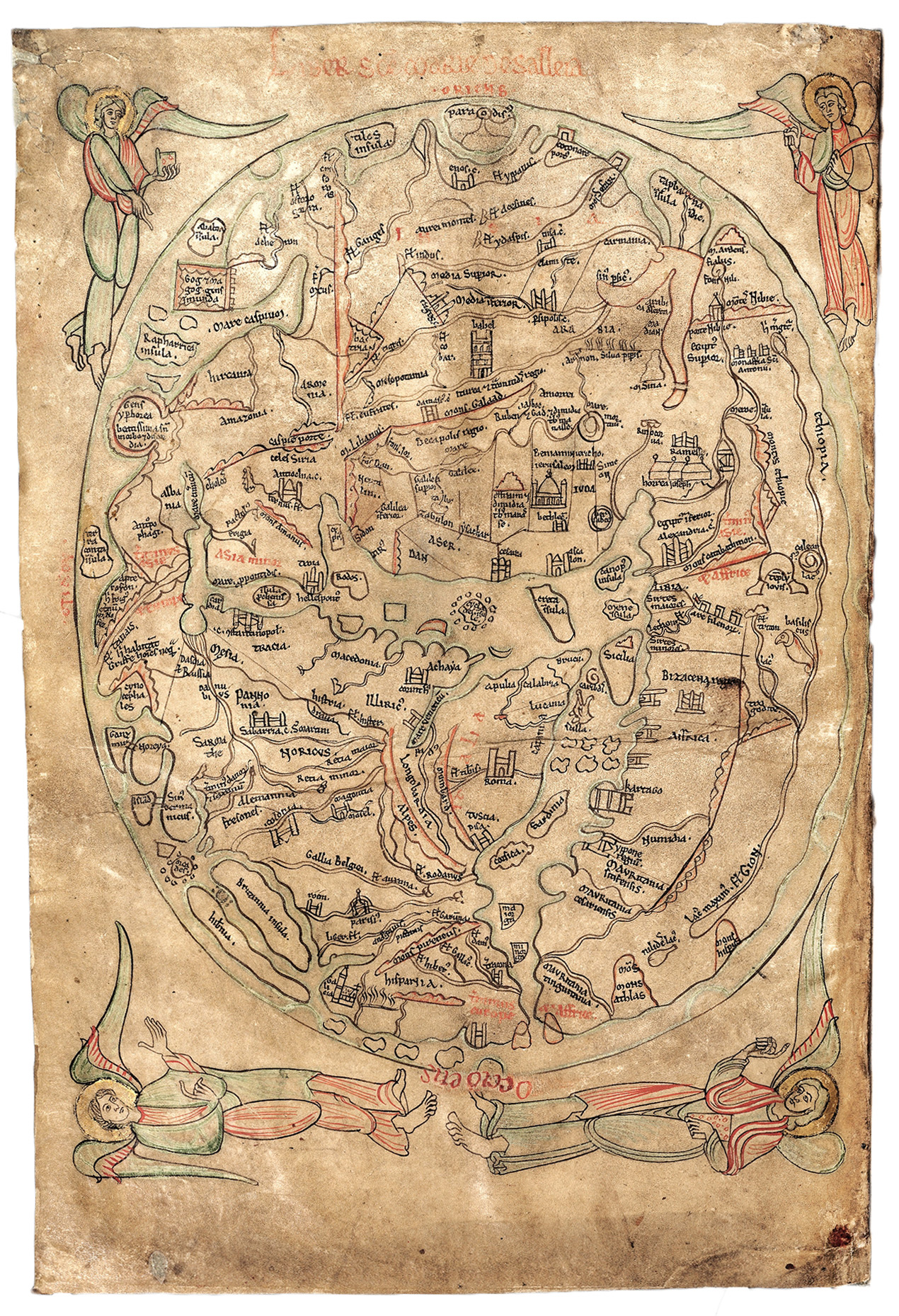
The Sawley map in the Parker Library at Corpus Christi College, Cambridge

The Sawley map, formerly known as the 'Henry of Mainz' map, is the earliest surviving mappa mundi (world map) made in England. It was made between about 1180 and the early 13th century. The map is the frontispiece of a copy of the Imago mundi of Honorius of Autun. It is oriented with east (and the Garden of Eden) at the top and the island of Delos at the centre.

The map takes up the second page (folio 1^{v}) of manuscript 66 at Corpus Christi College, Cambridge. The first folio is of thicker vellum than the rest of the manuscript. The manuscript was probably copied at Durham Priory before being given to Sawley Abbey (now in Lancashire) in the early 13th century. The map is oval in shape, with winged figures (angels, not winds) decorating the four corners of the rectangular page. It measures about 30 by 20 centimetres (11.8 in × 7.9 in). Across the top of the page is a faint ex libris in Latin: Liber s[an]c[t]e Marie de Salleia, 'book of Saint Mary's of Sawley'.

The map depicts three continents—Asia, Africa and Europe—surrounded by a world ocean. It is in colour, with green representing the ocean and purple the rivers. Mountains are depicted as series of red lobes. Places are marked by circles, square and pictographic symbols, such as towers or, in the case of Jerusalem, a temple. Delos, at the centre, was noted for its pagan temples. It is depicted as a circle surrounded by smaller circles (the Cyclades). Orkney is depicted in the same way.

The Sawley map is usually grouped with other encyclopaedic mappae mundi of the same period, such as the Hereford map and the Ebstorf map (the latter destroyed by bombing in the Second World War). It contains much fanciful material and many pieces of information derived from the Bible and the classics. It may belong to a northern French tradition, if it was copied from the mappa mundi which Bishop Hugh of Le Puiset bequeathed to Durham Priory in 1195.

The misattribution of the map to Henry of Mainz, possibly the future Archbishop Henry I, stems from a misreading of the prologue, which states that this version of the Imago mundi was edited by Henry in 1110. It does not mention the map, which is not an integral part of the Imago but was created decades later. Whether or not the Cambridge MS. 66 version of the text was even edited by any Henry of Mainz has been challenged. No other manuscript of the Imago contains a copy of the Sawley map or one like it. The only thing that can be said for certain of the connection between the Sawley map and the accompanying text is that they could be found bound together at Sawley shortly after 1200.

== Bibliography ==
- Delano-Smith, Catherine; Kain, Roger J. P. (1999). English Maps: A History. University of Toronto Press. ISBN 978-0-8020-4742-7.
- Dragnea, Mihai (2021). "Constructions of Christian Identity in the Northern Periphery: The Sawley World Map in Twelfth-Century England". The Journal of Ecclesiastical History. 72 (4): 1–25. doi:10.1017/s0022046920002596.
- Harvey, P. D. A. (1997). "The Sawley Map and Other World Maps in Twelfth-century England". Imago Mundi. 49 (1): 33–42. doi:10.1080/03085699708592857.
- Licini, Patrizia (2007). "A Full Image of a Cultural Space: The Sawley Mappa Mundi as a Global Memory Hypertext". In Ulrich Knefelkamp; Kristian Bosselmann-Cyran (eds.). Grenze und Grenzüberschreitung im Mittelalter: 11. Symposium des Mediävistenverbandes vom 14. bis 17. März 2005 in Frankfurt an der Oder. Akademie Verlag. pp. 470–489. doi:10.1524/9783050049892.470. ISBN 978-3-05-004989-2.
