= Radulf the Cistercian =

Radulphe (also spelled Radulph, Rodolphe, etc.) was a French monk who, without permission from his superiors, left his monastery in France and travelled to the Rhine Valley during the Second Crusade (1145–1149) where he preached "that the Jews should be slain as the enemies of the Christian religion." At Cologne, Simon "the Pious" was murdered and mutilated; at Speyer a woman was tortured on the rack to persuade her to convert to Christianity. Secular prelates tried to protect the Jews. Arnold, the Archbishop of Cologne gave them a fortified castle as refuge, and allowed them to arm themselves; the Crusaders refrained from attacking the castle, but killed any unconverted Jew that fell into their clutches. Henry I, Archbishop of Mainz, admitted into his house some Jews pursued by a mob; the mob forced its way in, and killed them before his eyes.

The Archbishops appealed to Bernard of Clairvaux, the most influential Christian of his time; Bernard replied with a strong denunciation of Radulphe, and demanded an end to violence against the Jews. When Radulphe continued his campaign Bernard came in person to Germany, "protested energetically against the unchristian behavior of Radulph" and forced the monk to return to his monastery.

Thereafter in 1147 the mutilated body of a Christian was found at Würzburg; Christians charged Jews with the crime, and, despite the protests of Bishop Emicho von Leiningen, attacked them, killing 20 and wounding many more; the bishop buried the dead in his garden.

From Germany, Rodolphe's idea of "beginning the Crusades at home" passed back to France, and Jews were massacred at Carentan, Rameru, and Sully. In Bohemia 150 Jews were murdered by Crusaders. After the terror had passed, the local Christian clergy did what it could to help the surviving Jews; and those who had accepted baptism under duress were allowed to return to Judaism without incurring the dire penalties of apostasy.
