= Arnold I of Cologne =

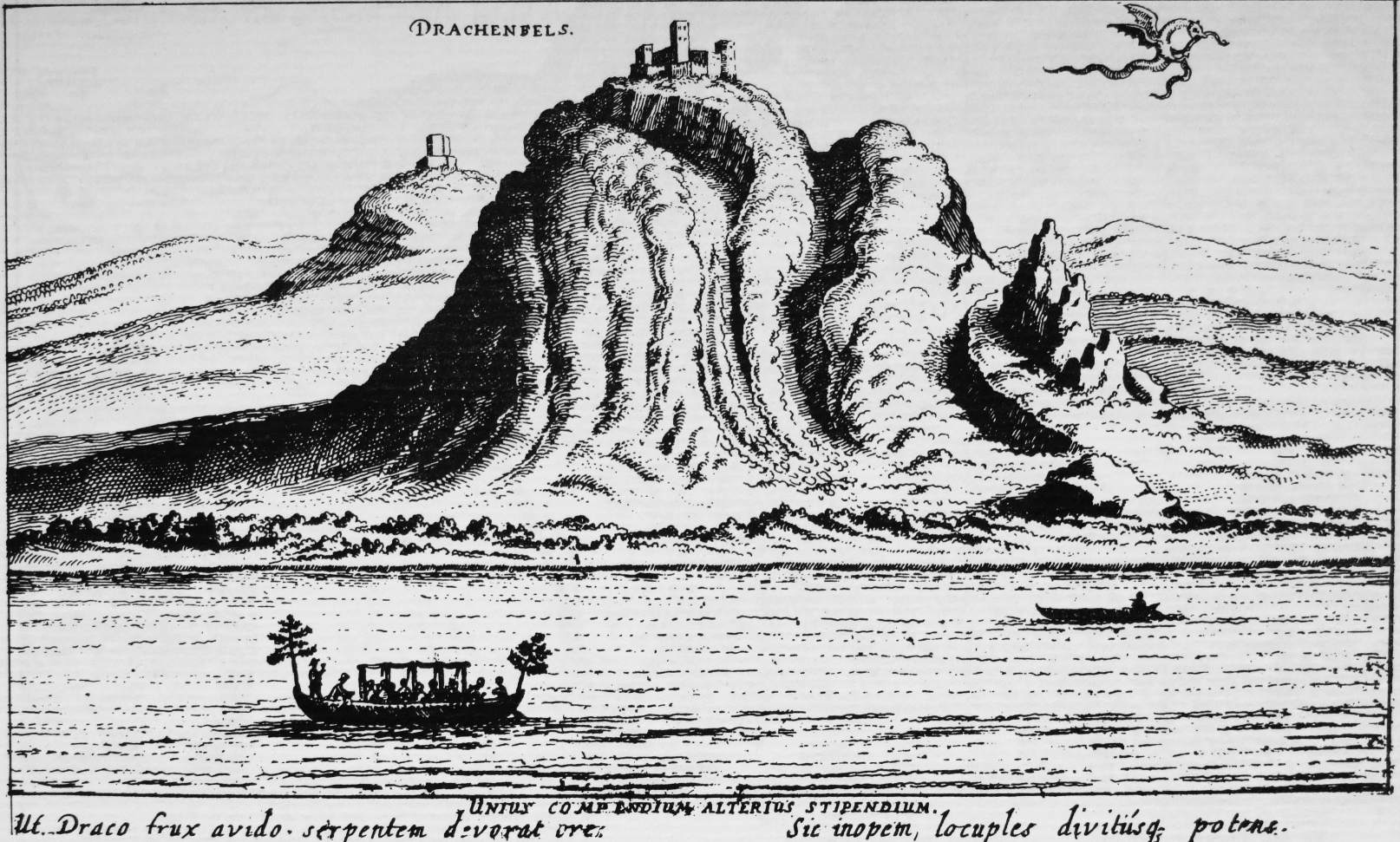
Burg Drachenfels, and in the background Wolkenburg on an engraving by Matthäus Merian (1618/19)

Arnold I (c. 1100 – 3 April 1151) was Archbishop of Cologne from 1137 to 1151.

== Life ==
Arnold's origins are not definitively known. It is assumed he came from the lower Rhenish nobility. He became Provost of St. Andreas in Cologne in about 1124, and was elected the new Archbishop of Cologne in December 1137, after two archbishops had died in that year. After participating in the second election of Conrad III as King of Germany in Coblenz on 7 March 1138, Arnold received his consecration on 3 April 1138. Some time after this date he had a castle built on the Drachenfels ("Dragon's Rock") in the Siebengebirge mountain range near Bonn.

In 1146 during the Second Crusade, when the monk Radulphe left his monastery in France and travelled to Cologne and the Rhine Valley to preach pogroms against the Jews, Arnold was one of the churchmen who tried most actively to protect them. He made available to them the castle of Wolkenburg, near Königswinter, which had been built in 1118 by his predecessor archbishop Frederick I to secure his region in the south; and permitted the Jews to arm themselves. He also wrote to Bernard of Clairvaux, the influential head of the Cistercians, appealing for his help. Bernard replied with a strong denunciation of Radulphe, and demanded an end to violence against the Jews. When Radulphe continued his campaign Bernard came in person to Germany, "protested energetically against the unchristian behavior of Radulph", and forced the monk to return to his monastery.

Arnold was present for visit of Pope Eugene III to Trier on 10 November 1147. But in 1149 Eugene III suspended him, on accusations of simony and neglect of his official duties.

Arnold died in Cologne on 3 April 1151, and was buried in the Church of St. Andreas.

Preceded by Hugo von Sponheim	Archbishop of Cologne; 1138–1151	Succeeded by Arnold II von Wied
