= V-in-square map =

Type of ancient world map

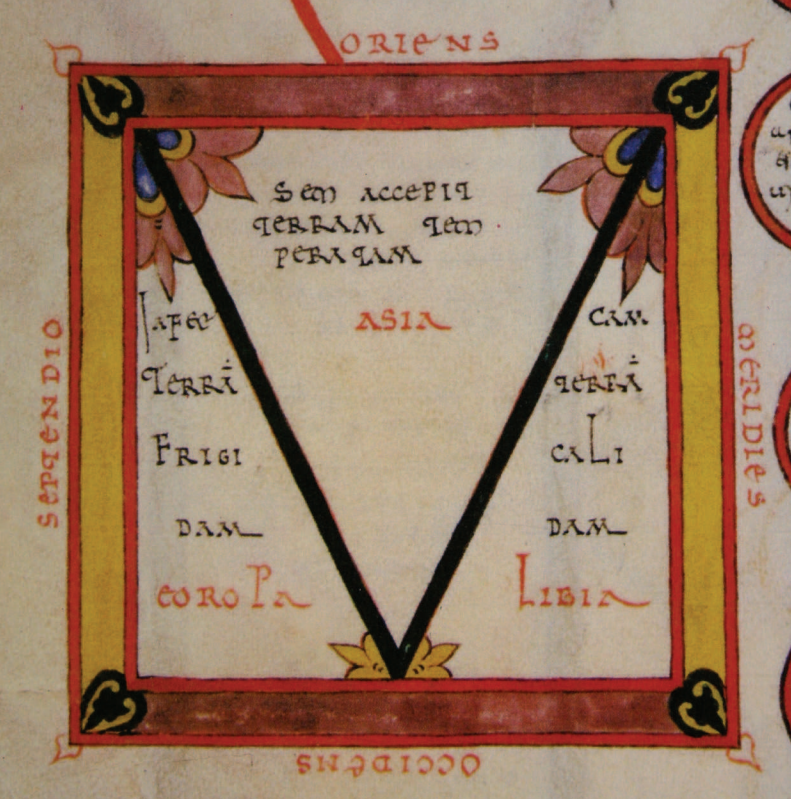
A V-in-square map with all four edges correctly labelled by cardinal direction and the continents identified with Noah's sons and their climates (temperate Asia, frigid Europe and hot Africa)

The V-in-square (or V-in-◻) map is a highly schematic type of mappa mundi (world map) in use in Europe during the Middle Ages. It is based on and usually found in conjunction with the Etymologiae of Isidore of Seville.

== Description ==
The V-in-square map is named from its basic shape, by analogy with the T and O map. It is a square map divided into three parts by a V. These are labelled after the three sons of Noah, each corresponding to one of the known continents: Japheth for Europe on the left, Shem for Asia in the middle (inside the V) and Ham for Africa on the right. Like the T and O map, it is oriented with east at the top. Confusingly, the left edge is often labelled west and the right edge south, while the bottom is unlabelled. Some maps label the cardinal directions more logically, but most label the areas with the names of Noah's sons rather than the names of the continents.

David Woodward classifies it as a mappa mundi of the schematic tripartite type. Michael Andrews classifies it as of the oecumenical tripartite type, by which he means that it depicts only the habitable world known to the medievals, to the exclusion of the Antipodes. Marcia Kupfer questions whether the V-in-square "figure" should be considered a map at all, since the correspondence between Noah's sons and the continents is not normally indicated and it is a presumption that the labelling of east and west on adjacent sides should be considered an error.

== Usage ==
A Renaissance elaboration of the V-in-square concept, in which "what had been the rectangular edges of the earth have become the frame of a view of the earth". The earth's curvature is depicted on the horizon. The positions of Europe and Africa have been curiously reversed.

The geography of V-in-square maps is based on a single sentence in the Etymologiae of Isidore of Seville, written in the early 7th century: "For Asia extends from south to north in the east, but Europe from the north to the west, Africa from the west to the south." There are 35 known examples of V-in-square maps and 31 of them are illustrations of Book 14 of the Etymologiae, where they always accompany a T and O map. Only three V-in-square maps are not accompanied by a T and O map. The two map types both generally show Asia as being the same size as Europe and Africa combined, but the T and O map is otherwise a much better representation of Isidore's full description of the world. Although Isidore may have included a T and O map in his original work, the V-in-square map does not originate with him, but was probably designed by an early copyist. Although the V-in-square map illustrates Book 14, the names of Noah's sons are drawn from Book 9.

V-in-square maps appear only in manuscripts. The earliest known example is found with a copy of the Etymologiae made before 811. It continued to be included in copies as late as the 15th century, but not later. The most elaborate example of the type was that painted by the Master of Jouvenel des Ursin for a copy of Giovanni Colonna's Mare historiarum, which may have been based on a V-in-square map in a copy of Raoul de Presles's translation of Augustine's De civitate Dei, where it could have been used to show the monstrous races as all descended from Adam.

A copy of Corpus Pelagianum made at Oviedo around 1200 (now Madrid, Biblioteca nacional de España, MS 1513, but known as the Códice de Batres) contains a highly unusual square map on the back of the first folio. Patrick Marschner suggests that it is based on the V-in-square map type influenced by the T and O: "the map ... seems to follow the schematic approach of the V-in-square maps rather than that of T-O maps." it is square with the cardinal directions labelled, the continents labelled by Noah's sons and divided into three parts albeit with vertical lines, perhaps to better accommodate the copious text.

== Table of maps ==
The following is a table of V-in-square maps cited by Van Duzer 2012, plus the V-in-square-inspired map discussed in Marschner 2021 (marked in blue). It is not a complete list.

Image	Location	Library	Shelfmark	Folio	Date	Notes
	Rouen	Bibliothèque municipale	524	74v	before 811	This is a copy of Isidore's Etymologiae.
	Madrid	Biblioteca nacional de España	Vitr. 14-2	12v	1047	Map is found with the genealogical tables in a copy of Beatus of Liébana's Commentary on the Apocalypse made for King Ferdinand I of León and Queen Sancha.
	Vienna	Österreichische Nationalbibliothek	67	117r	12th century	This is a copy of Isidore's Etymologiae.
	Douai	Bibliothèque municipale	320	109r	12th century	This is a copy of Isidore's Etymologiae.
	Munich	Bayerische Staatsbibliothek	CLM 14731	83v	12th century	The manuscript is a miscellany. This is the only example of the T and O and V-in-square maps found together outside of the Etymologiae.
	Madrid	Biblioteca nacional de España	1513	1v	c. 1200	Not a true V-in-square map, but follows the basic scheme.
	Rouen	Bibliothèque municipale	1019	107v	13th century	This is a copy of Isidore's Etymologiae.
	Paris	Bibliothèque nationale de France	Lat. 9427	156v		The manuscript, a lectionary, dates to the 7th or 8th century, but the map was added by a later scribe.
	New Haven	Beinecke Library	Marston 123	131v	mid-15th century	This is a copy of Isidore's Etymologiae.
	Paris	Bibliothèque nationale de France	Lat. 4915	26v	1447–1455	This is a copy of Giovanni Colonna's Mare historiarum.

== Bibliography ==
- Andrews, Michael C. (1926). "The Study and Classification of Medieval Mappae Mundi". Archaeologia. 75: 61–76. doi:10.1017/S0261340900010407.
- Destombes, Marcel (1964). Mappemondes, A.D. 1200–1500. Commission des Cartes Anciennes de l'Union Geographique Internationale.
- Kupfer, Marcia (2013). "The Noachide Dispersion in English Mappae Mundi c. 960 – c. 1130". Peregrinations: Journal of Medieval Art and Architecture. 4 (1): 81–106.
- Marschner, Patrick S. (2021). "The World Map of the Corpus Pelagianum (BNE, 1513, fol. 1v) and its Strategies of Identification". Medieval Worlds. 13: 195–228. doi:10.1553/medievalworlds_no13_2021s195.
- Relaño, Francesc (2002). Relaño, Francesc (ed.). The Shaping of Africa: Cosmographic Discourse and Cartographic Science in Late Medieval and Early Modern Europe. Ashgate. doi:10.4324/9781315194554. ISBN 978-1-315-19455-4.
- Van Duzer, Chet (2012). "A Neglected Type of Medieval Mappamundi and Its Re-imaging in the Mare Historiarum (BnF MS Lat. 4915, Fol. 26v)". Viator. 43 (2): 277–301. doi:10.1484/J.VIATOR.1.102714.
- Woodward, David (1987). "Reference Guide to Types of Mappaemundi". In J. B. Harley; David Woodward (eds.). The History of Cartography. Vol. 1: Cartography in Prehistoric, Ancient and Medieval Europe and the Mediterranean. University of Chicago Press. pp. 343–358.
