= Mappa mundi =

Medieval European maps of the world

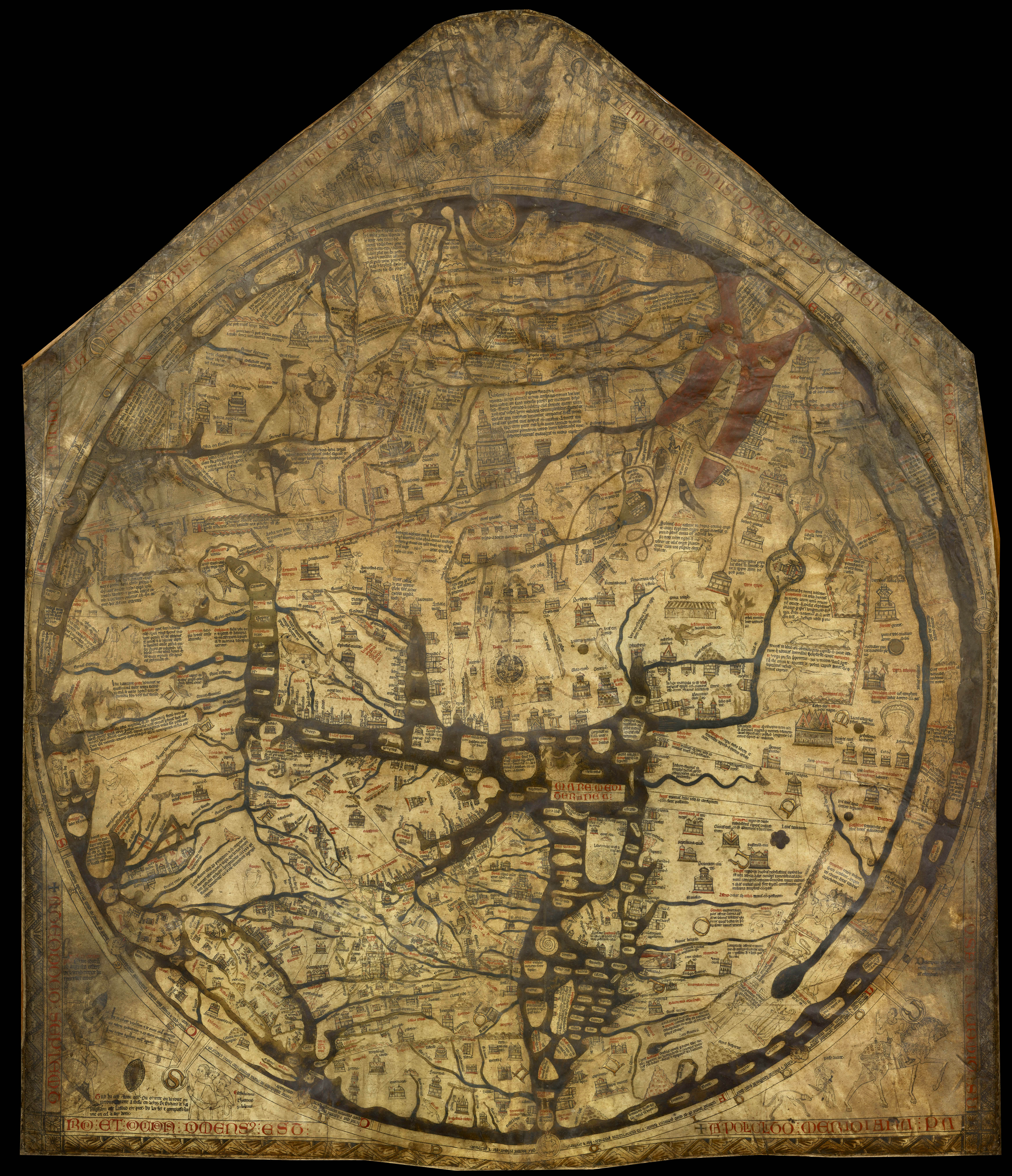
The Hereford Mappa Mundi, c. 1300, Hereford Cathedral, England

A mappa mundi (Latin [ˈmappa ˈmʊndiː]; plural = mappae mundi; French: mappemonde; Middle English: mappemond) is any medieval European map of the world. Such maps range in size and complexity from simple schematic maps 25 millimetres (1 inch) or less across to elaborate wall maps, the largest of which to survive to modern times, the Ebstorf map, was around 3.5 m (11 ft 6 in) in diameter. The term derives from the Medieval Latin words mappa (cloth or chart) and mundus (world).

Around 1,100 mappae mundi are known to have survived from the Middle Ages. Of these, some 900 are found in illustrated manuscript books and the remainder exist as stand-alone documents.

== Types of mappae mundi ==
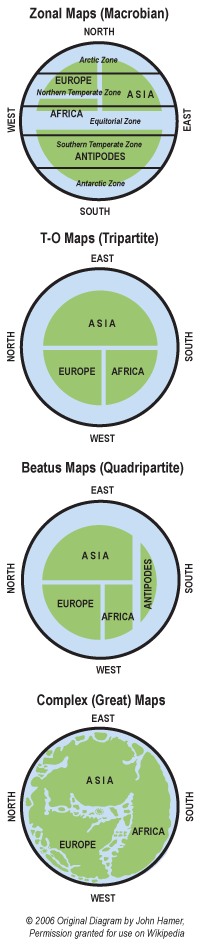
Diagram illustrating the major categories of mappae mundi

Extant mappae mundi come in several distinct varieties, including:

- Zonal maps (sometimes called Macrobian maps)
- Tripartite maps (including "T-O" and "V-in-◻" maps)
- Quadripartite maps (including the Beatus maps)
- Complex maps

Medieval world maps which share some characteristics of traditional mappae mundi but contain elements from other sources, including Portolan charts and maps associated with Ptolemy's Geography are sometimes considered a fifth type, called "transitional mappae mundi".

=== Zonal maps ===
Zonal maps are pictures of the Eastern Hemisphere. Their purpose was to illustrate the concept that the world is a sphere with latitudinal climate zones, most often the five Aristotelian climes:

- The northern frigid zone
- the northern temperate zone
- the equatorial tropical zone
- the southern temperate zone
- the southern frigid zone

Of these, only the two temperate zones at middle latitudes were believed to be habitable, and the known world was contained entirely within the northern temperate zone's Eastern Hemisphere. As most surviving zonal maps are found illustrating Macrobius' Commentary on Cicero's Dream of Scipio (an excerpt of Cicero's De Re Publica), this type of map is sometimes called "Macrobian". In their simplest and most common form, Zonal mappae mundi are merely circles divided into five parallel zones, but several larger zonal maps with much more detail have survived.

=== Tripartite maps ===
T-O maps, unlike zonal maps, illustrate only the habitable portion of the world known to medieval Europeans, limiting their perspective to a relatively small portion of the Earth's Northern Hemisphere. The landmass was illustrated as a circle (an "O") divided into three portions by a "T". These three divisions were the continents of Asia, Africa and Europe. The popularity of the Macrobian maps and the combination of T-O style continents on some of the larger Macrobian spheres illustrate that Earth's sphericity continued to be understood among scholars during the Middle Ages.

The V-in-square map depicts the Earth divided between the sons of Noah.

=== Quadripartite or Beatus maps ===
Quadripartite maps represent a sort of amalgam of the zonal and T-O maps by illustrating the three known continents separated by an equatorial ocean from a fourth unknown land, often called Antipodes. Fourteen large quadripartite maps are found illustrating different manuscripts of Beatus of Liébana's popular Commentary on the Apocalypse of St John. These "Beatus maps" are believed to derive from a single (now lost) original which was used to illustrate the missions of the twelve apostles of Jesus Christ.

=== Complex maps ===
The "complex" or "great" world maps are the most famous mappae mundi. Although most employ a modified T-O scheme, they are considerably more detailed than their smaller T-O cousins. These maps show coastal details, mountains, rivers, cities, towns and provinces. Some include figures and stories from history, the Bible and classical mythology. Also shown on some maps are exotic plants, beasts and races known to medieval scholars only through Roman and Greek texts. Prior to its destruction in World War II, the Ebstorf map at 3.5 m (11 ft 6 in) across was the largest surviving mappa mundi. Today that honour is held by the surviving centre portion of the Hereford map which is 147 cm across and 175 cm top to bottom. Other important maps in this group are the Cotton or Anglo-Saxon map, the Psalter map and the Sawley map. The somewhat later mappae mundi that accompany the popular Polychronicon of Ranulf Higden should probably be viewed as degenerate forms of the earlier complex maps.

Complex mappae mundi include:

Name	Date	MS locations	Dimensions
The Albi or Merovingian map	c. 730	Médiathèque Pierre-Amalric, Albi	29 cm × 23 cm (11.4 in × 9.1 in)
The so-called Vatican map of Isidore of Seville	776	Vatican Library, Vatican City. Lat. 6018, fol. 64 v.–65 r.	
The Anglo-Saxon or Cotton map	c. 1025–1050	British Library, London. Cotton Tiberius B.v, fol. 56v	21 cm × 17 cm (8.3 in × 6.7 in)
The map of Theodulf of Orleans	11th century	Vatican Library, Vatican City. Reg. Lat. 123, fol. 143 v.–144 r.	
The Sawley map	1190-1210	Corpus Christi College, Cambridge, MS 66, pt. 1	29.5 cm × 20.5 cm (11.6 in × 8.1 in)
The Vercelli Map	c. 1219	Archivio Capitolare, Vercelli	84 cm × 72 cm (2.76 ft × 2.36 ft)
The Ebstorf map	c. 1235	Found in Ebstorf in 1843; destroyed by bombing in Hanover in 1943	3.56 m × 3.58 m (11.7 ft × 11.7 ft)
The Psalter map	13th century	British Library, London	14.2 cm × 9.5 cm (5.6 in × 3.7 in)
The Hereford map	c. 1300	Hereford Cathedral, Hereford	1.5 m (4.9 ft)
The Borgia Map	early 15th century	Vatican Library, Vatican City	
The Fra Mauro map	1459–1460	Museo Correr, Venice	2.4 m × 2.4 m (7.9 ft × 7.9 ft)

== Purpose of mappae mundi ==
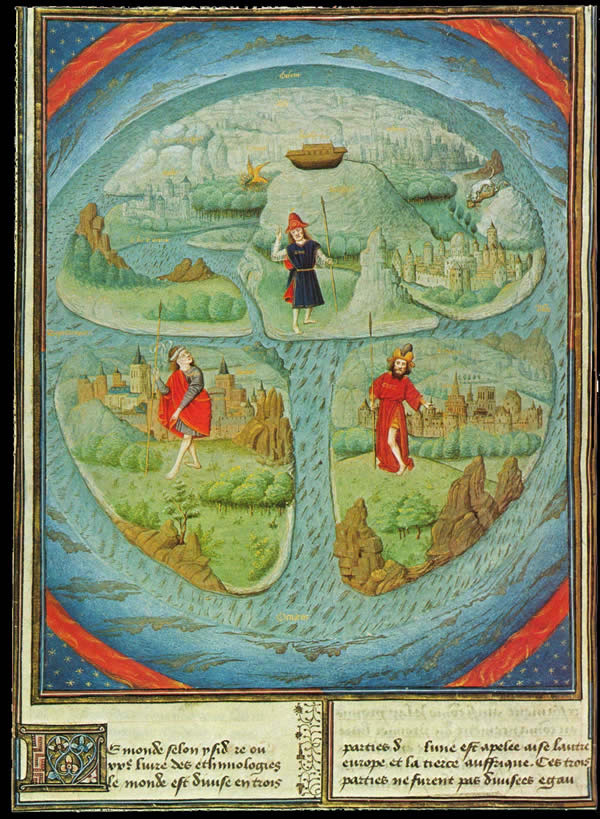
Mappa Mundi in La Fleur des Histoires, 1459–1463, showing at top Noah's Ark on Mount Ararat

To modern eyes, mappae mundi can look superficially primitive and inaccurate. However, mappae mundi were never meant to be used as navigational charts and they make no pretence of showing the relative areas of land and water. Rather, mappae mundi were schematic and were meant to illustrate different principles. The simplest mappae mundi were diagrams meant to preserve and illustrate classical learning easily. The zonal maps should be viewed as a kind of teaching aid – easily reproduced and designed to reinforce the idea of the Earth's sphericity and climate zones. T-O maps were designed to schematically illustrate the three land masses of the world as it was known to the Romans and their medieval European heirs.

The larger mappae mundi have the space and detail to illustrate further concepts, such as the cardinal directions, distant lands, Bible stories, history, mythology, flora, fauna and exotic races. In their fullest form, such as the Ebstorf and Hereford maps, they become minor encyclopedias of medieval knowledge.

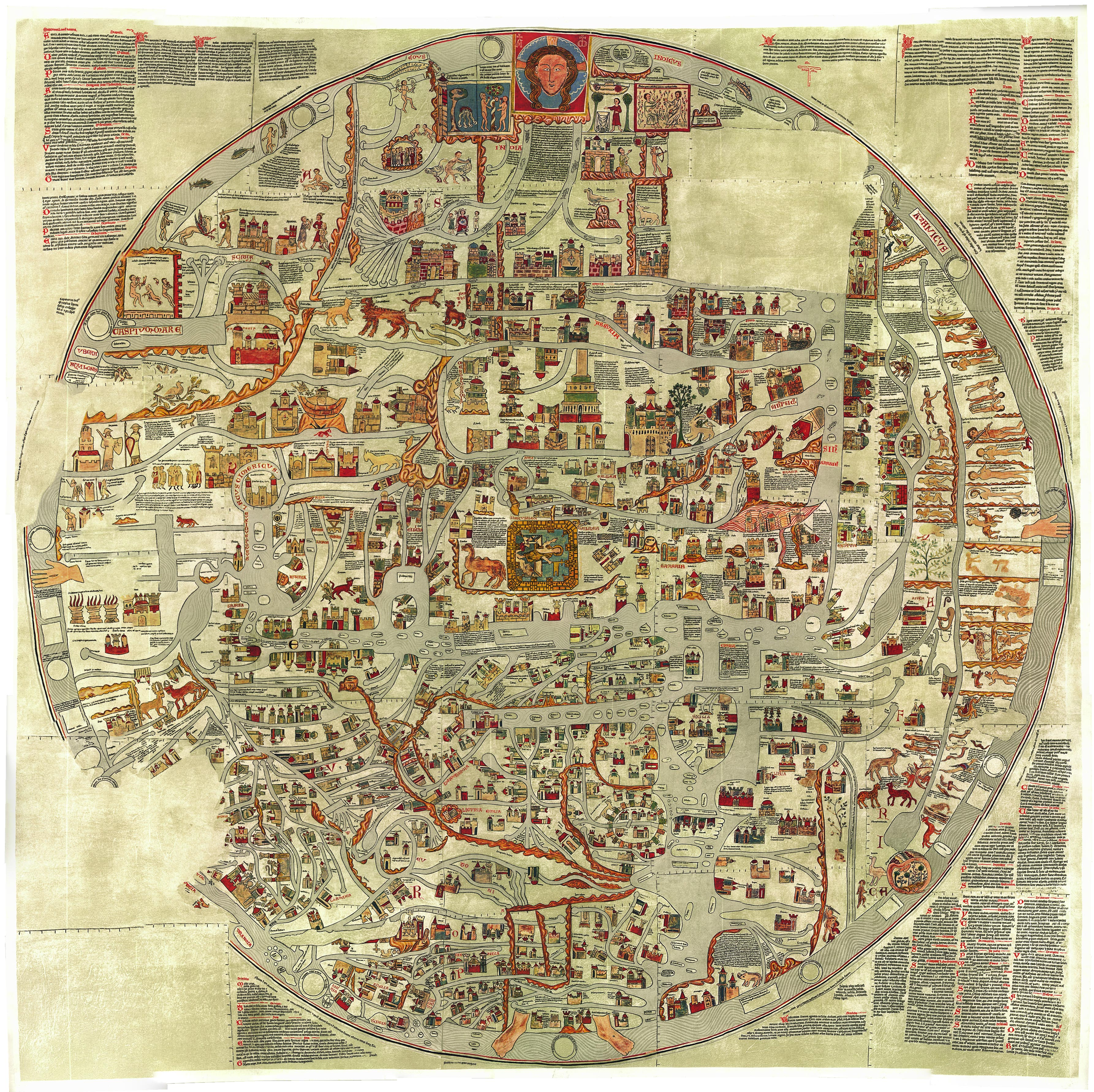
A modern recreation of the Ebstorf Map, which dated from about 1235; the original was destroyed by wartime bombing.

In her study, Brigitte Englisch shows that the medieval world maps (the mappae mundi) both from their concept and in their concrete practice are founded on a systematically geometric projection of the known world. The basis of this projection, however, is not geographical surveying but the harmonious order of God’s creation. Using regular geometric forms like circles and triangles which are also regarded as religiously perfect, they created a coherent planispheric system. This quite basically presents the known world in its real geographic appearance which is visible in the so-called Vatican Map of Isidor (776), the world maps of Beatus of Liebana’s Commentary on the Apocalypse of St John (8th century), the Anglo-Saxon Map (ca. 1000), the Sawley map, the Psalter map, or the large mappae mundi of the 13th century (Hereford/Ebstorf).

== End of the tradition ==
Beginning with the Carta Pisana in the late thirteenth century, a new style of map based on charts of the Mediterranean Sea began to emerge. Now known as "Portolan charts", these maps are characterized by extremely accurate coastlines with criss-crossing rhumb lines. A particularly famous example is the Catalan Atlas attributed to Abraham Cresques in the Bibliothèque nationale de France. During the late Middle Ages and with the coming of the Renaissance, western Europeans became reacquainted with the work of many ancient Greek scholars. In the field of geography and map-making, the coordinate system which Claudius Ptolemy outlined in the Geography became extremely influential. Over time maps influenced by these new ideas displaced the older traditions of mappae mundi. The last examples of the tradition, including the massive map of Fra Mauro, may be seen as hybrids, incorporating Portolan-style coastlines into the frame of a traditional mappa mundi.

== See also ==
- Early world maps
- Hereford Mappa Mundi
- Virtual Mappa
- Here be dragons
- Terra incognita
- Portolan chart
