= Ebstorf Map =

Medieval European world map

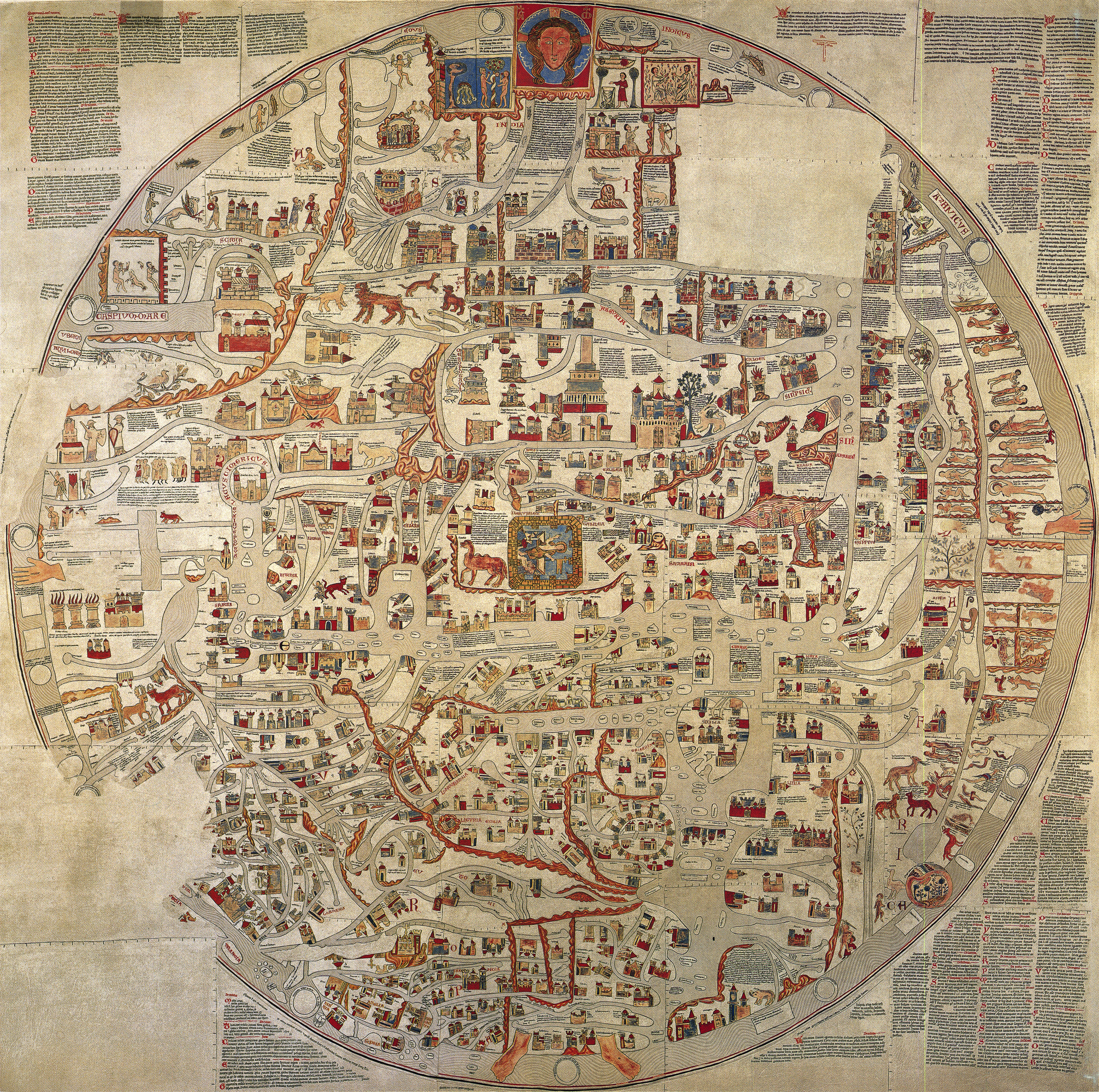
Photo of a reproduction of the Ebstorf Map, with east at the top

The Ebstorf Map was an example of a mappa mundi (a medieval European map of the world). It was made by Gervase of Ebstorf, who was possibly the same man as Gervase of Tilbury, some time between 1234 and 1240.

== Description ==
The map was found in a convent in Ebstorf, northern Germany, in 1843. It was a very large map, painted on 30 sheets of sheepskin parchment sewn together and measuring around 3.6 by 3.6 metres (12 ft × 12 ft) – a greatly elaborated version of the common medieval tripartite map (T and O), centered on Jerusalem with east at the top.

The head of Christ was depicted at the top of the map, with his hands on either side and his feet at the bottom. Rome is represented in the shape of a lion, and the map reflects an evident interest in the distribution of bishoprics.

There was text around the map, which included descriptions of animals, the creation of the world, definitions of terms, and a sketch of the more common sort of T and O map with an explanation of how the world is divided into three parts. The map incorporated both pagan and biblical history.

The original was destroyed in 1943 during Allied bombing of Hanover in World War II. However, a set of black-and-white photographs taken in 1891 of the original map survives, and several colour facsimiles of it were made before it was destroyed.

== Authorship ==
The arguments for Gervase of Tilbury being the mapmaker are based on the name Gervase, which was an uncommon name in northern Germany at the time, and on some similarities between the world views of the mapmaker and Gervase of Tilbury. Other points of contention include the date of the map's creation and the age of Gervase of Tilbury. Some contend he was too old to be considered the author of the map while others say that his age has been over-estimated and he could have drawn the map. The editors of the Oxford Medieval Texts edition of Gervase of Tilbury's Otia Imperialia conclude that although their being the same man is an "attractive possibility", to accept it requires "too many improbable assumptions". Others suggest that the map is a copy of an original made by Gervase of Tilbury and may have been produced as late as 1300.
