= T and O map =

Type of medieval world map

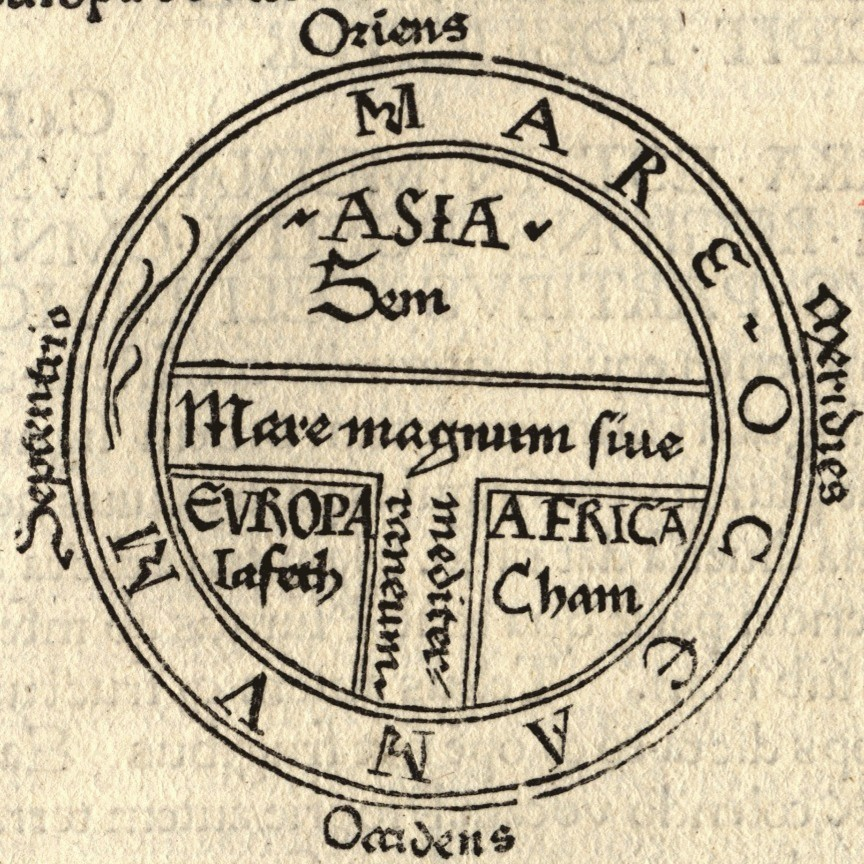
This T and O map, from the first printed version of Isidore's Etymologiae, identifies the three known continents as populated by descendants of Sem (Shem), Iafeth (Japheth) and Cham (Ham).

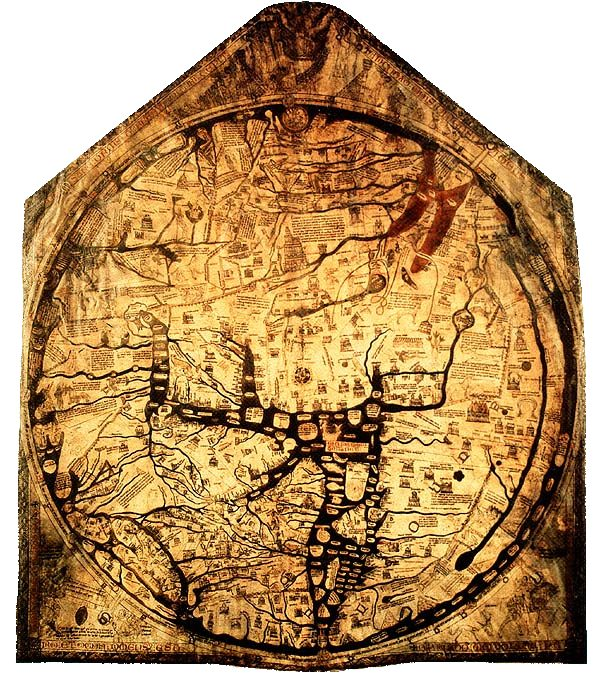
The Hereford Mappa Mundi, c. AD 1300, Hereford Cathedral, England. A classic "T-O" map with Jerusalem at center, east toward the top, Europe at bottom left and Africa on the right.

A T and O map or O–T or T–O map (orbis terrarum, orb or circle of the lands; with the letter T inside an O), also known as an Isidoran map, is a type of early world map that represents the Afro-Eurasian landmass as a circle (= O) divided into three parts by a T-shaped combination of the Mediterranean sea, the river Tanais (Don) and the Nile. The origins of this diagram are contested, with some scholars hypothesizing an origin in Roman or late antiquity, while others consider it to have originated in 7th- or early 8th-century Spain.

The earliest surviving example of a T-O map is found in a late 7th- or early 8th-century copy of Isidore of Seville's (c. 560 – 636) De natura rerum, which alongside his Etymologiae (c. 625) are two of the most common texts to be accompanied by such a diagram in the Middle Ages. A later manuscript added the names of Noah's sons (Sem, Iafeth and Cham) for each of the three continents (see Biblical terminology for race). A later variation with more detail is the Beatus map drawn by Beatus of Liébana, an 8th-century Spanish monk, in the prologue to his Commentary on the Apocalypse.

== Relevant textual descriptions of the world ==
The earliest T-O maps are closely associated with two sections of the work of Isidore of Seville:

De Natura Rerum 48.2-3 (drawn verbatim from Hyginus' De astronomia 1.9(8) and Augustine of Hippo's City of God 16.17):

So the earth may be divided into three sides (trifarie), of which one part is Europe, another Asia, and the third is called Africa. Europe is divided from Africa by a sea from the end of the ocean and the Pillars of Hercules. And Asia is divided from Libya with Egypt by the Nile... Moreover, Asia – as the most blessed Augustine said – runs from the southeast to the north ... Thus we see the earth is divided into two to comprise, on the one hand, Europe and Africa, and on the other only Asia.

Etymologiae 14.2.1:

The world is called round after the roundness of a circle, because it is like a wheel [...] Because of this, the Ocean flowing around it is contained in a circular limit, and it is divided in three parts, one part being called Asia, the second Europe, and the third Africa.

== History and description ==
=== Spherical Earth concept ===
Although Isidore taught in the Etymologiae that the Earth was "round", his meaning was ambiguous and some writers think he referred to a disc-shaped Earth. However, other writings by Isidore make it clear that he considered the Earth to be spherical. Indeed, the spherical Earth had been the prevailing scholarly assumption since at least Aristotle, who had delineated a frigid clime at the poles, a torrid clime near the equator, and a habitable temperate clime in between.

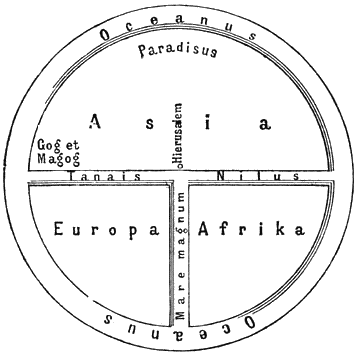
Ideal reconstruction of medieval world maps (from Meyers Konversationslexikon, 1895)

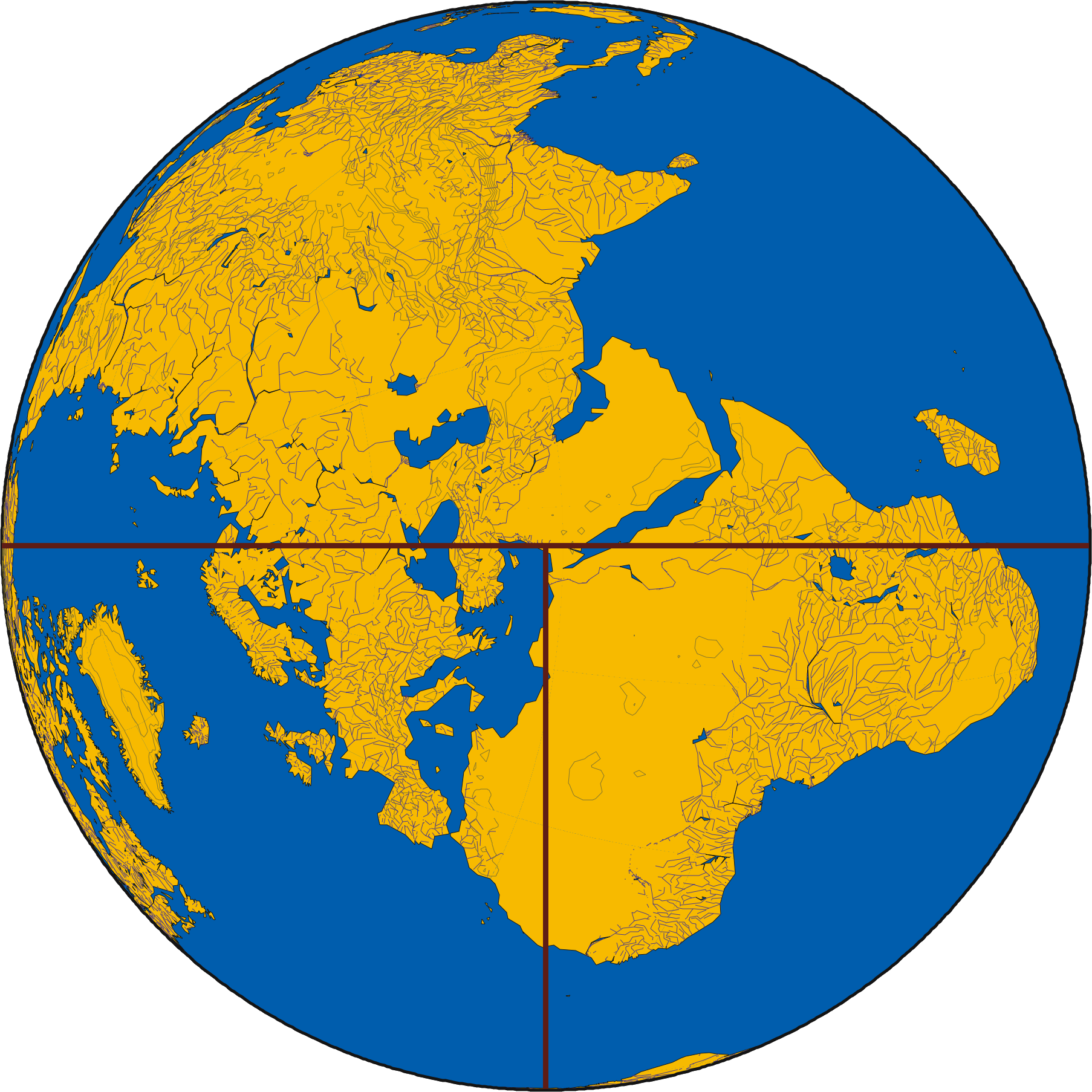
A "T-O" map made with modern cartography

The T and O map represents only half of the spherical Earth, presumably a convenient projection of the known northern temperate region. It was believed that no one could cross the torrid equatorial clime and reach the unknown lands to the south, the antipodes.

=== Boundaries, center and orientation ===
The T is the Mediterranean, the Nile, and the Don (formerly called the Tanais) dividing the three continents, Asia, Europe and Africa, and the O is the encircling ocean. In line with Isidore's description, Asia is normally depicted as equal in size to Africa and Europe combined. The majority T-O maps are oriented to the east, though examples of north, south and westward orientation can also be found.

The idea that Jerusalem was generally represented in the center of the map as the navel of the world, the umbilicus mundi, is a false generalisation from a relatively small number of very famous 13th-century mappae mundi. The earliest T-O maps marked no particular geographic center and while some early mappae mundi were specifically centered on classical sites like Delos or the Cyclades, most simply had the Mediterranean or Aegean Sea in the middle. It was only after the First Crusade that Jerusalem began to be represented as the center of the world on medieval maps, a trend which rose to prominence from the mid-12th century through the early-14th century, but was never universally observed.

The location of Paradise (the Garden of Eden) in the east of Asia is based upon the Septuagint translation of Genesis 2:8, which describes the garden of Eden being planted in the east. This is a longstanding feature of Christian textual geographies, and while not present on the earliest T-O maps, it is a prominent feature of many early mappae mundi, especially the Beatus maps. These depictions are often combined with a depiction of the four rivers of Paradise: the Tigris, Euphrates, Pishon and Gihon, the latter two of which were sometimes understood by medieval cartographers as the Ganges and Nile (or Geon) respectively. These were either depicted as flowing within/out from paradise and/or as four major rivers on the map.

=== Additional details ===
This qualitative and conceptual type of medieval cartography could yield extremely detailed maps in addition to simple representations. The earliest maps had only a few cities and the most important bodies of water noted.

Different cartographic material, which represented more useful tools for the traveler, were the itinerarium, which listed in order the names of towns between two points, and the periplus that did the same for harbors and landmarks along a seacoast.

Later maps of the T-and-O conceptual format featured many rivers and cities of Eastern as well as Western Europe, and other features encountered during the Crusades. Decorative illustrations were also added in addition to the new geographic features. The most important cities would be represented by sketches of fortifications and towers in addition to their names, and the empty spaces would be filled with mythical creatures.

== Gallery ==
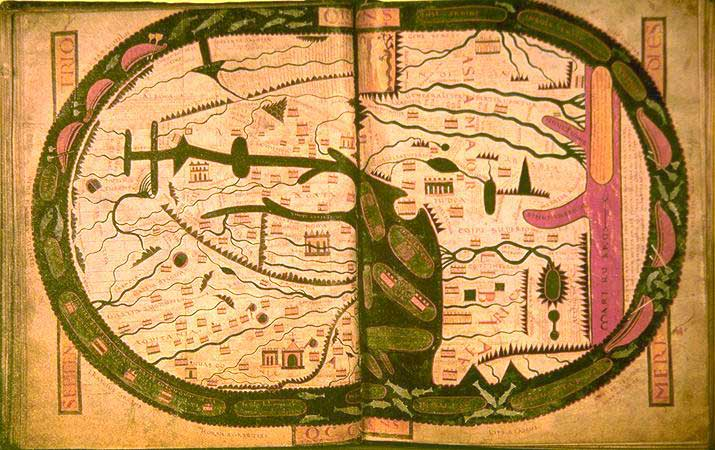
The world map from the Saint-Sever Beatus, dating to c. AD 1050

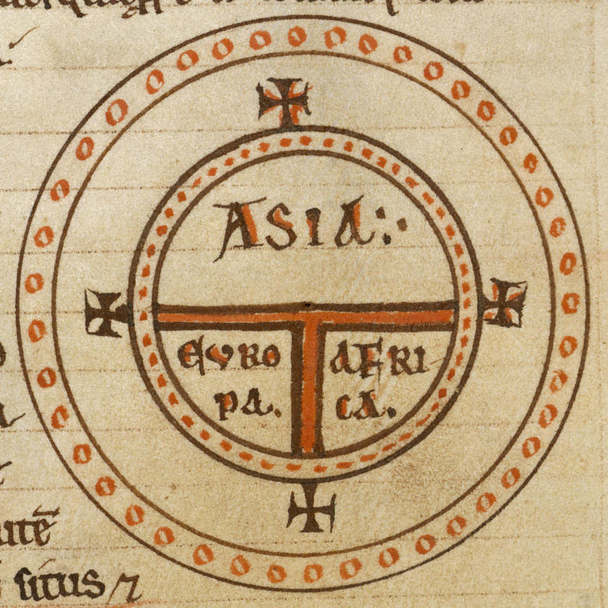
From a 12th-century copy of Etymologiae

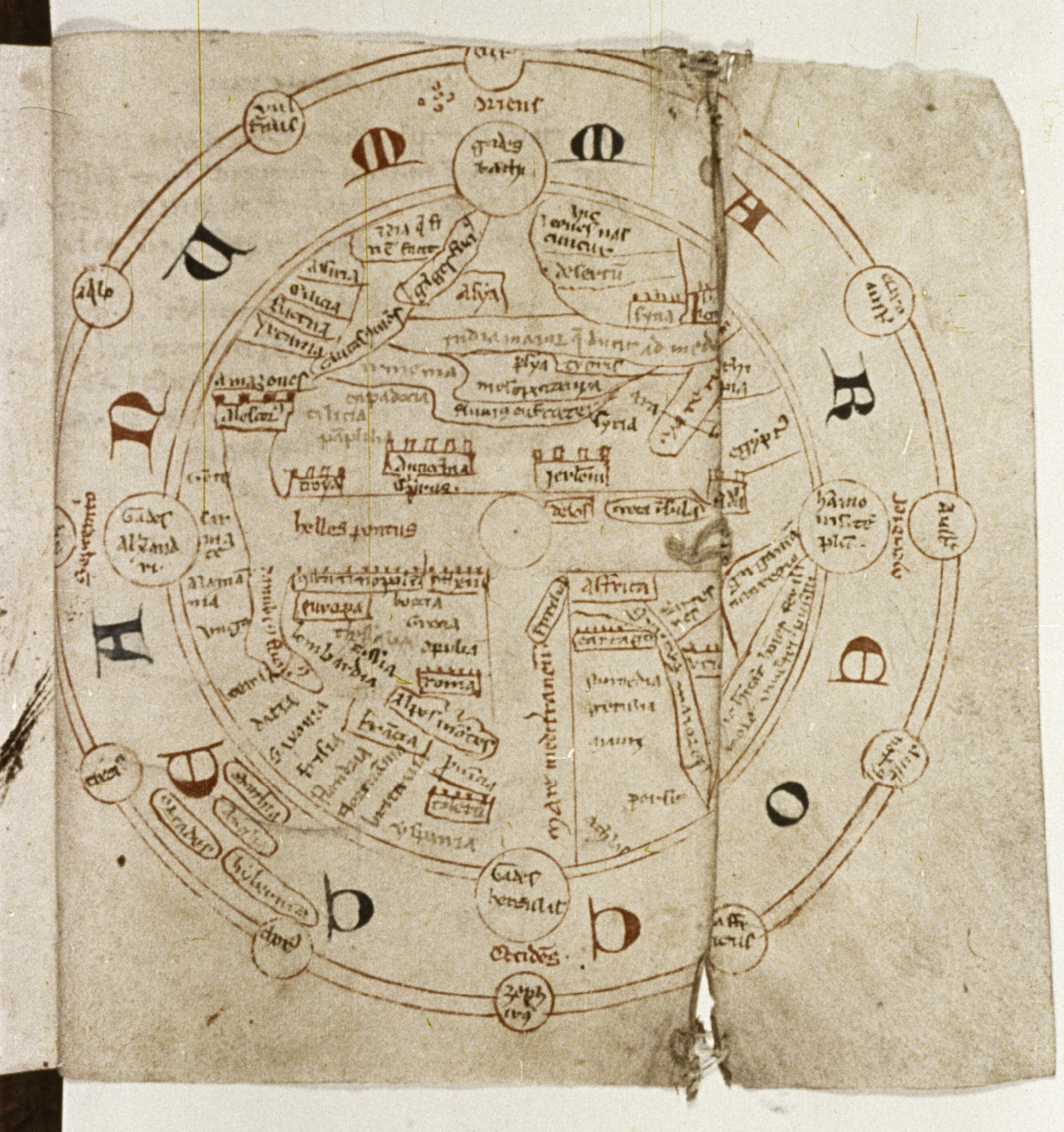
Map centred on Delos according to Greek tradition, from a French manuscript of Henry of Huntingdon, late 13th century

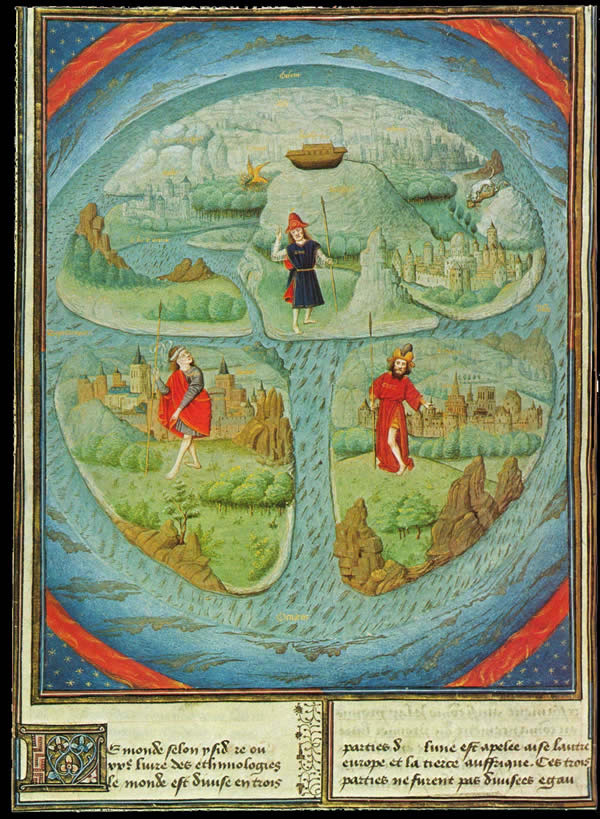
Mappa Mundi in La Fleur des Histoires, 1459–1463

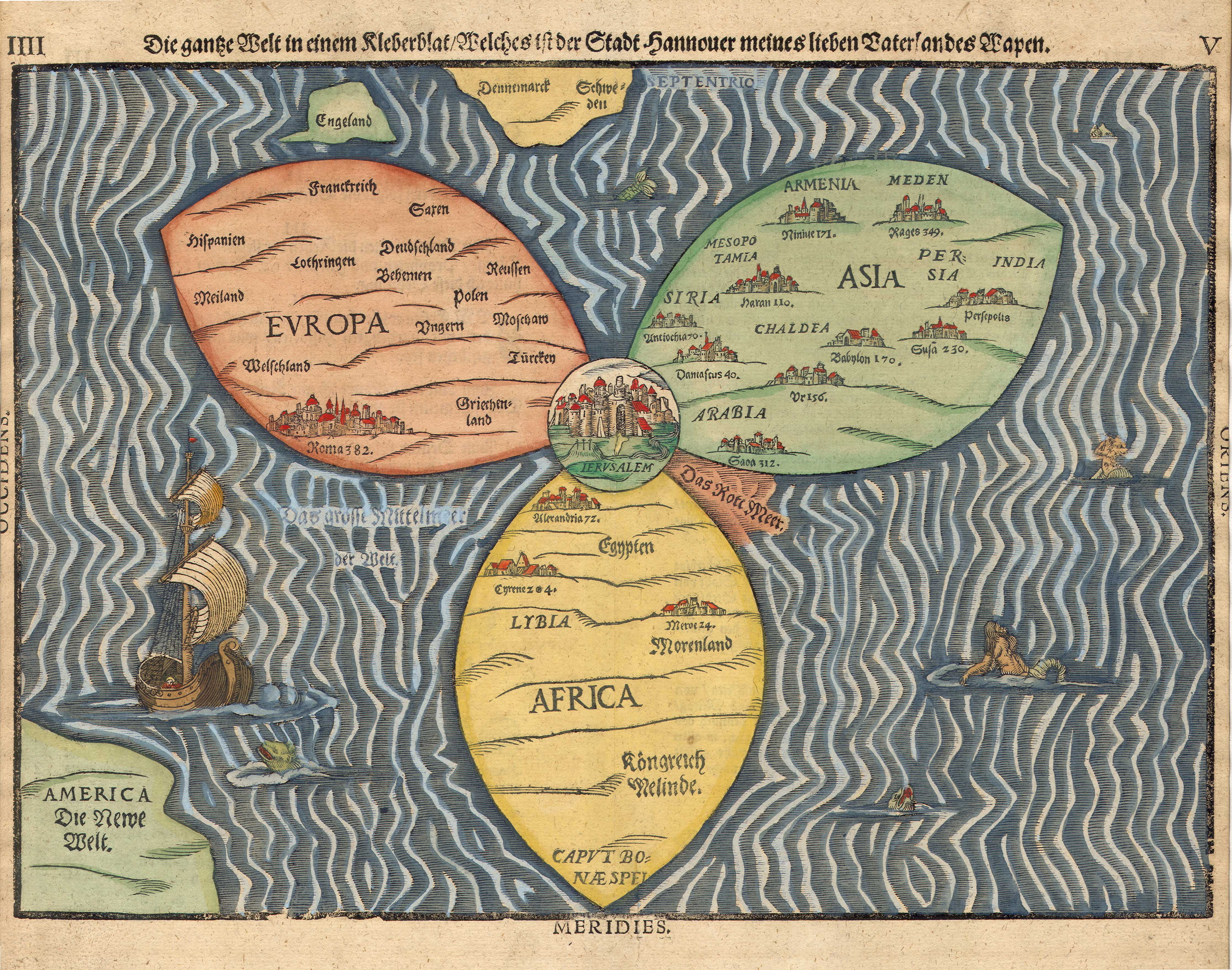
The Bünting cloverleaf map. A 1581 woodcut, Magdeburg. Jerusalem is in the center, surrounded by Europe, Asia and Africa.

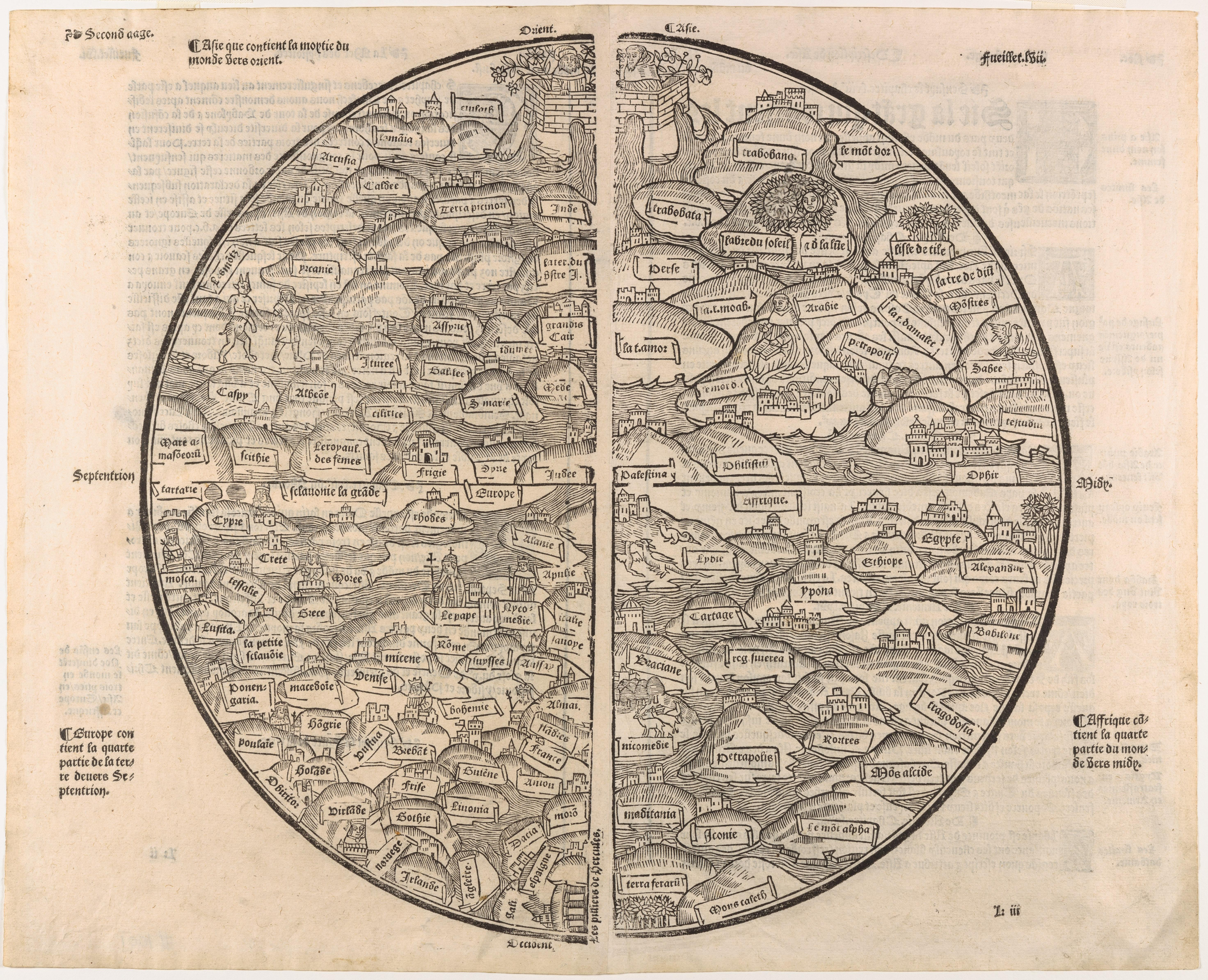
Unknown, Mer des hystoires world map, 1491, following the model of the T-O map, centered on Jerusalem with East (the biblical location of Paradise) at the top

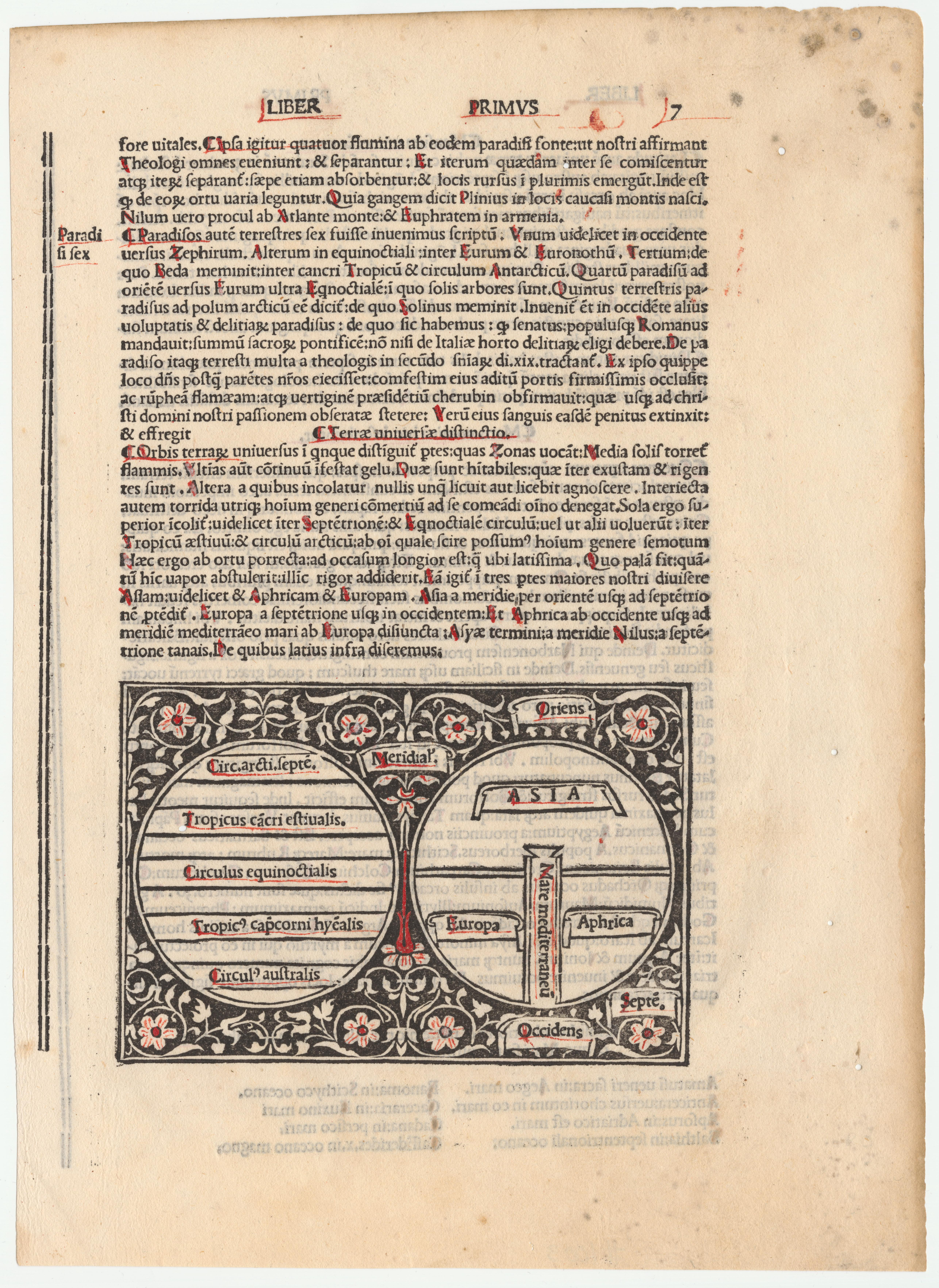
On the left part of the sheet is a zonal or climatic map, communicating geographical information. On the right is a "T-O" map. By Jacobus Philippus Bergomensis.

T and O map accompanied by a V-in-square map, from a copy of the Etymologiae (c. late 8th century)

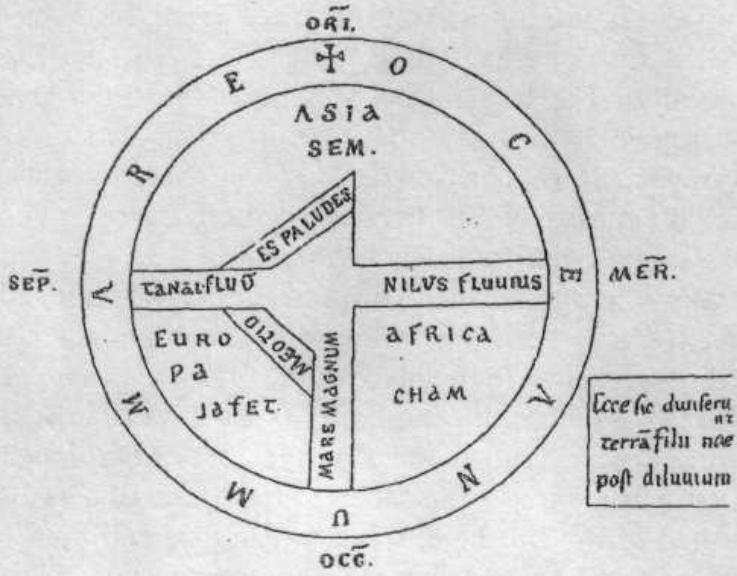
Map from the Saint Gall Isidore manuscript

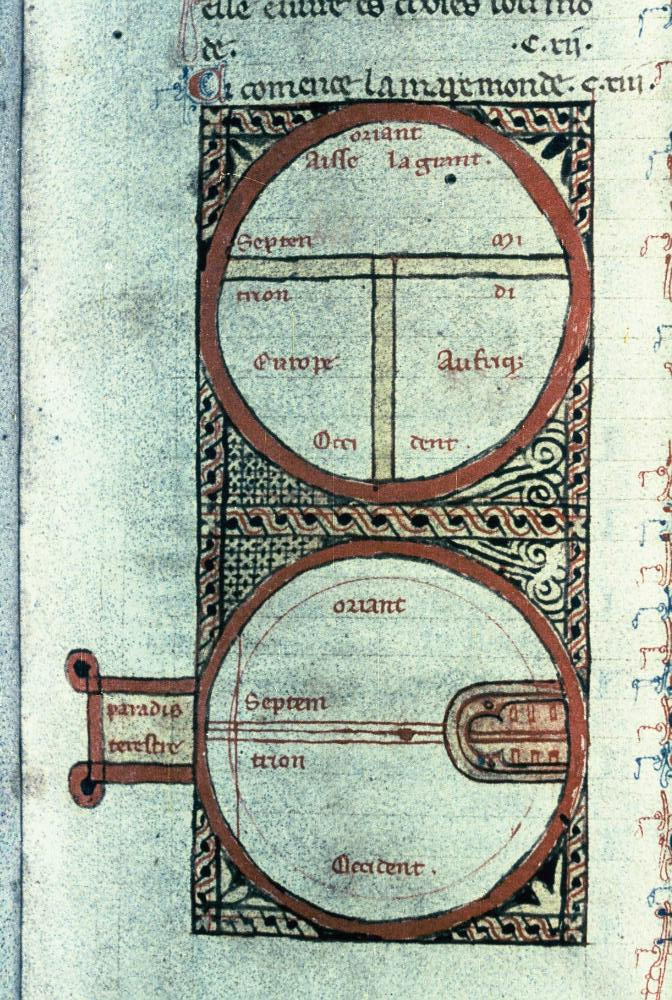
T and O map from the Flemish manuscript of Brunetto Latini, Le Livre dou Tresor, early 14th century

== See also ==
- Flat Earth, world view
- Globus cruciger
- Mappa mundi, medieval world map
- Babylonian Map of the World
