= Art patronage of Julius II =

Papal commissions in the Vatican (1503–13)

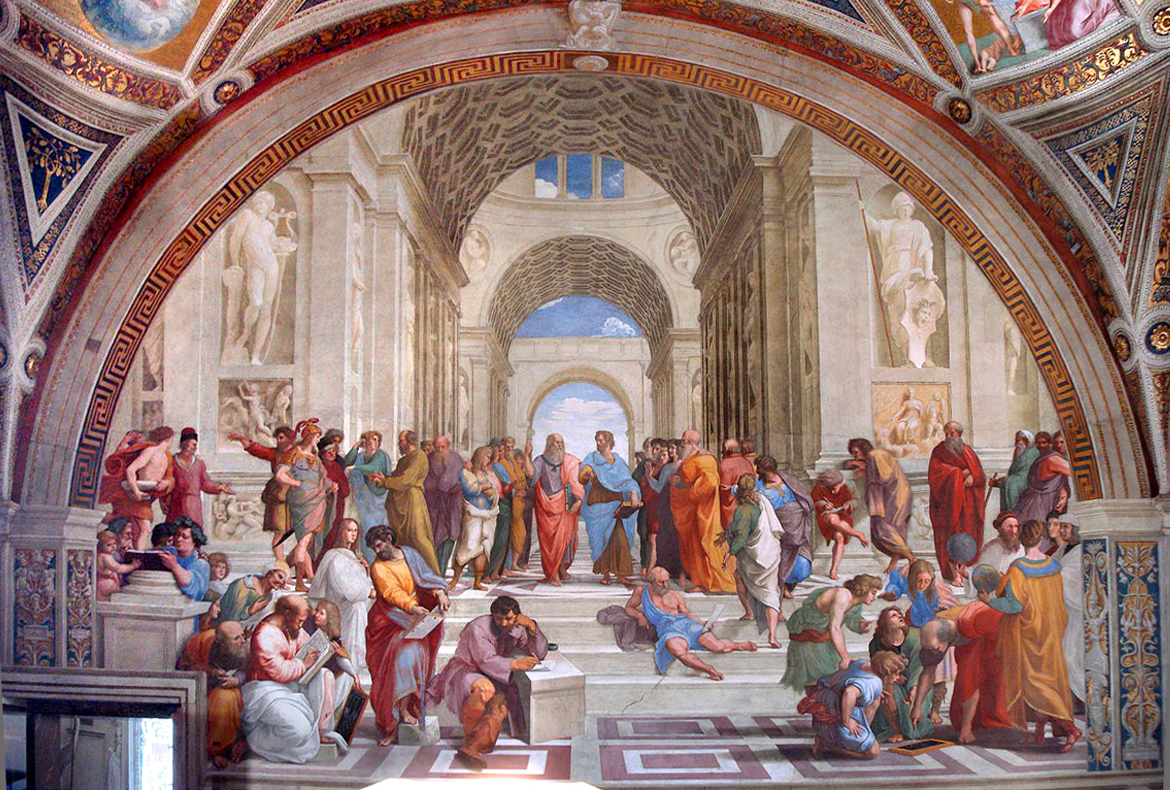
Raphael's, School of Athens (1509–1511), a fresco in the Raphael Rooms of the Apostolic Palace, Vatican

Pope Julius II (reigned 1503–1513), commissioned a series of highly influential art and architecture projects in the Vatican. The painting of the Sistine Chapel ceiling by Michelangelo and of various rooms by Raphael in the Apostolic Palace are considered among the masterworks that mark the High Renaissance in Rome. His decision to rebuild St Peter's led to the construction of the present basilica.

Julius died in 1513, and except for the Sistine Chapel ceiling, which he lived to see finished, his very largest commissions were finished after his death.

== Pope Julius II ==
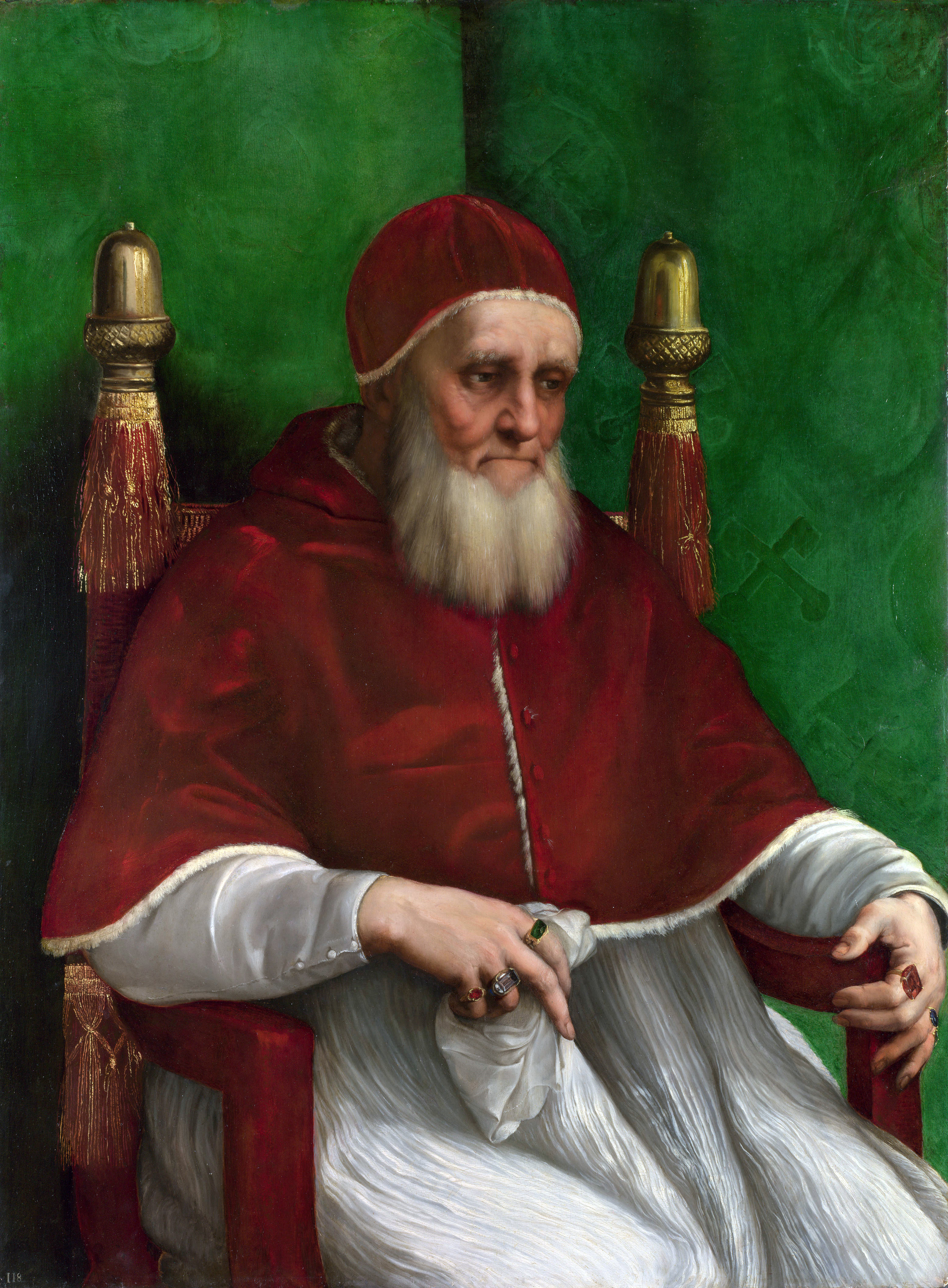
Portrait of Julius II by Raphael, 1511–12, National Gallery

The term High Renaissance was first used by Giorgio Vasari. Artists such as Michelangelo, Raphael and Bramante were at the height of their careers during this time. While Pope Julius II is also remembered as the "Warrior Pope" for his Machiavellian tactics, he was also given the name of "the Renaissance Pope." He modeled his patronage practices on those of his uncle Pope Sixtus IV (1471–84), and began amassing large personal and public art collections and commissioning numerous civic and religious buildings when he served as a cardinal and Cardinal Archbishop under Pope Nicholas V and Pope Innocent VIII respectively. His additions to the art collection of the Vatican may be Julius II's most impressive venture. He commissioned such projects as the painting of the Sistine Chapel ceiling, the reconstruction of St. Peter’s Basilica, and the frescoes of the four large Raphael Rooms, including the Stanza della Segnatura with the School of Athens and other frescos. His reasons for commissioning these, as well as other art works, were varied. They served political, spiritual and aesthetic purposes.

Also, during his papacy, the lead up to the Protestant Reformation produced increased tension in Christianity, which caused the Catholic Church to lose influence and political power in Europe. Several of his predecessors were poor, unjust, and impious rulers who caused people to doubt the papal seat and the Vatican’s monopoly on religion. For these reasons, among others, Julius requested the magnificent and powerful images that are still so recognizable today. When Julius died, several of his commissions were still underway or unfinished at the time of his death.

== Julius' commissions ==
- 1503–1512: The Cortile del Belvedere in the Vatican City
- 1505–(1545): Tomb of Julius II
- 1505–(1570s): St Peter's Basilica
- 1508–1512: The Sistine Chapel ceiling
- 1509–1520s: Raphael Rooms in the Vatican Palace
- 1511–1512: Portrait of Julius II by Raphael, following the loss of Bologna

== Imagery of Julius II ==
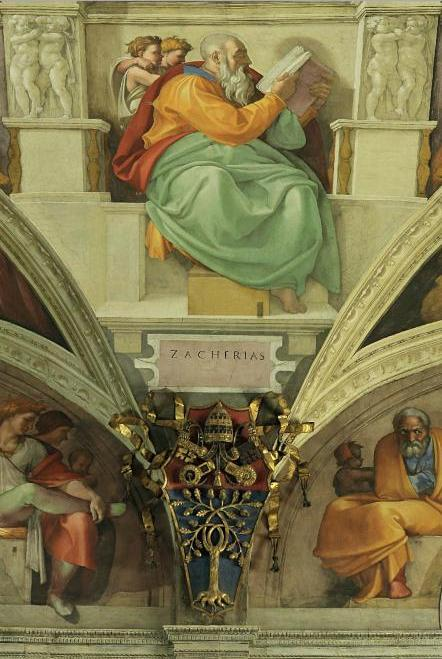
On the wall above the main entrance door of the Sistine Chapel fresco of the Prophet Zechariah lower, with the face of Pope Julius II, le below the coat of the same pope. Michelangelo.

During his reign, Julius II utilized his iconic status to his advantage, displaying his interest in the arts by placing himself on medals, emblems, and by commissioning specific artworks containing his image. Choosing to commission objects such as medals or coins is quite different from, having a portrait created. A medal or coin can be representative of an "antitype" or "modern counterpart" to typical, readable typologies that commonly appear in art. The "types" can serve as a code to decode antiquity, Renaissance or even Baroque art.

The most noticeable self-referencing image trend on the coins and works of art commissioned by Julius II was the "Della Rovere oak." In Italian "rovere" means oak, derived from the Latin robur, meaning strength or oak tree. The Spernadino medal of Giuliano Della Rovere (1488) is a prime example of a representation of the "Della Rovere oak". In addition, the giant oak in the Belvedere Courtyard was planted by Julius in 1504 to be incorporated into Bramante's design for the three-tiered area. The Della Rovere coat of arms bore an oak tree and the family was referenced with the emblem of the acorn, which had mythological, Christian, and Republican Roman iconographic associations.

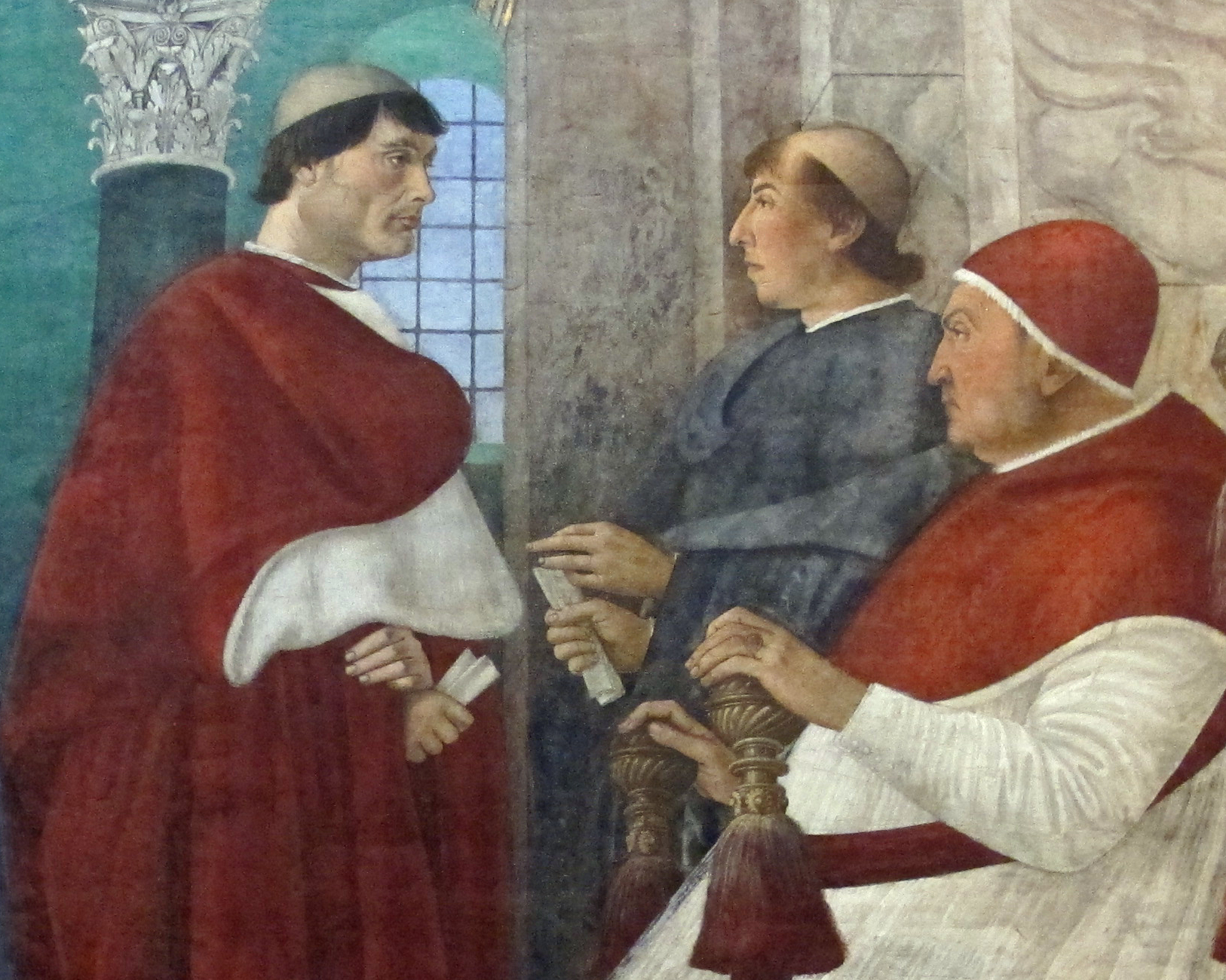
Giulliano della Rovere, as cardinal (left), with his uncle and patron Francesco della Rovere, Pope Sixtus IV (right)

=== Raphael's Portrait ===
In 1511, Julius commissioned two portraits of him by the master Raphael. One is in the Uffizi Gallery in Florence and the other in the National Gallery (London), the latter being the more famous of the two. Several years after its completion, Vasari would comment how it was 'true and lifelike in every way', and the composition became influential, seen in later portraits such as Titian's 'Pope Paul III' of 1543. Julius' long beard was a sign that he had recently lost the state of Bologna, and helps to date the painting, as the beard is recorded as being shaved off in March 1512.

== Julius II and his artists ==
Julius first came to appreciate Michelangelo’s work after seeing his Pietà, now in St Peter's Basilica, and commissioned him for several key projects:

=== The Tomb ===
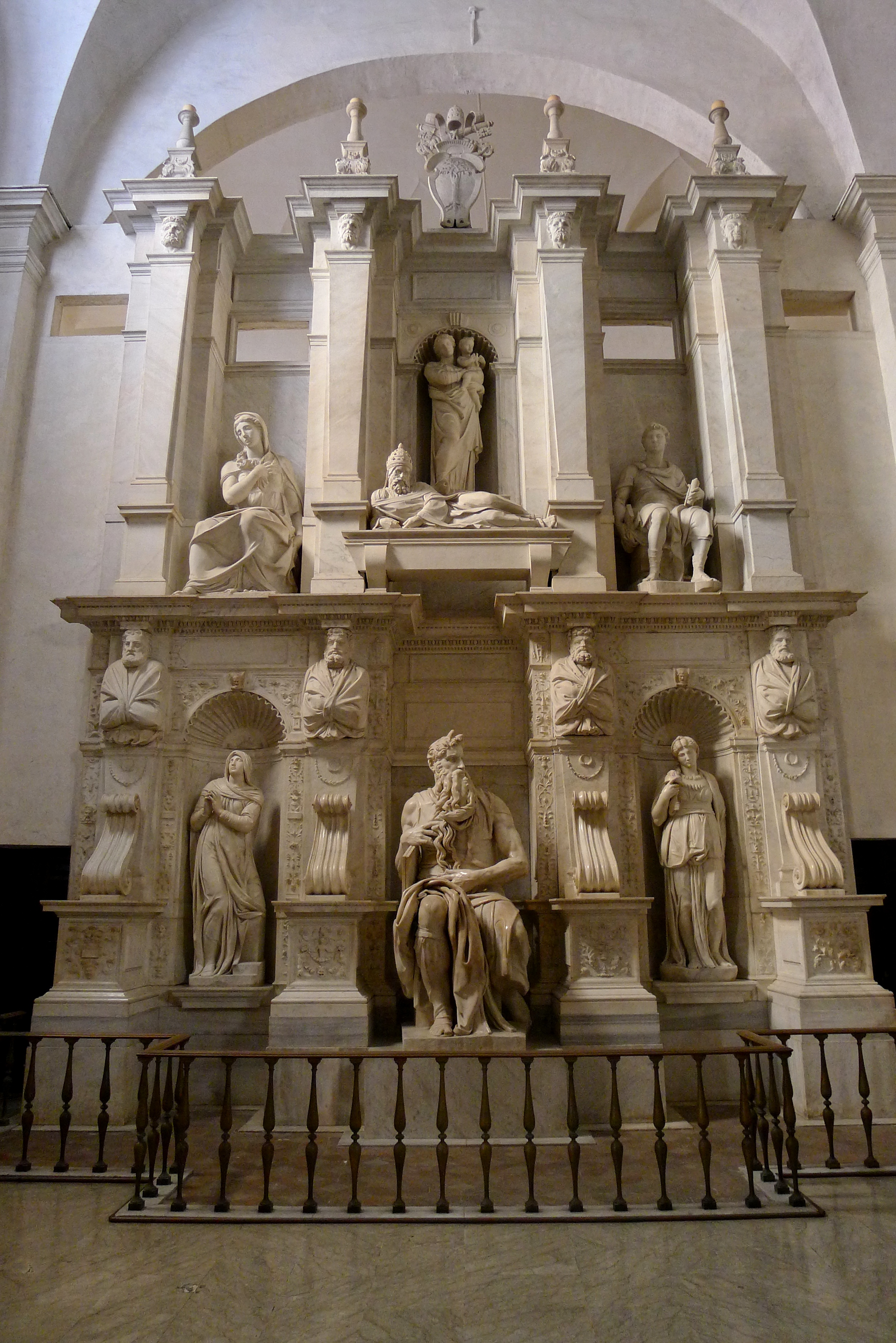
The tomb of Julius II, with Michelangelo's statues of Rachel and Leah on the left and the right of his Moses.

The Tomb of Julius II was originally commissioned in 1505, yet was not completed until 1545 on a much reduced scale:

- 1505 – Commissioned by Julius; Michelangelo spends 9 months choosing marble at Carrara
- 1506 – Michelangelo returns to Rome due to a lack of funds available for the project. Bramante and Raphael, apparently jealous of Michelangelo's commission, convince the Pope that it would be bad luck to have his tomb built during his own lifetime, and is dismissed by Julius. Michelangelo, angry and bitter, returns to Florence. Julius, now with his army in a siege against Bologna threatens to wage war on the state unless Michelangelo presents himself and apologises, which he does. Julius give Michelangelo the unwelcome task of creating a huge bronze sculpture of the Pope. This takes two years of incredibly hard work. He then returns to Rome, hoping the Pope will renew his interest in the Tomb project.
- 1508 – Bramante and Raphael convince the Pope that Michelangelo's time would be better spent on the Sistine Chapel ceiling in the Vatican Palace (assuming that Michelangelo, primarily a sculptor, would have great difficulty in completing a painting of such scale).
- 1512 – Michelangelo completes the Sistine Chapel ceiling project and returns to the tomb.
- 1513 – Michelangelo begins three sculptures for the project: the Dying Slave and the Rebellious Slave (now in the Louvre, Paris) and Moses, which is now a part of the final design. When Julius dies the new Pope Leo X abandons the project.
- 1516 – A new contract is agreed between Michelangelo and Julius' heirs who demand the completion of the project.
- 1520s – Carves The Genius of Victory and four unfinished slaves, which now sit in the Galleria dell'Accademia in Florence with the David
- 1532 – A second new contract is signed by Michelangelo which involves a wall-tomb.
- 1542 – The wall-tomb is begun by Michelangelo after final details are negotiated with Julius' grandson.
- 1545 – The final tomb is completed, and installed in San Pietro in Vincoli in Rome; it includes the original Moses sculpture along with Leah and Rachel on the lower level, and several other sculptures (definitively not by Michelangelo) on the upper level.

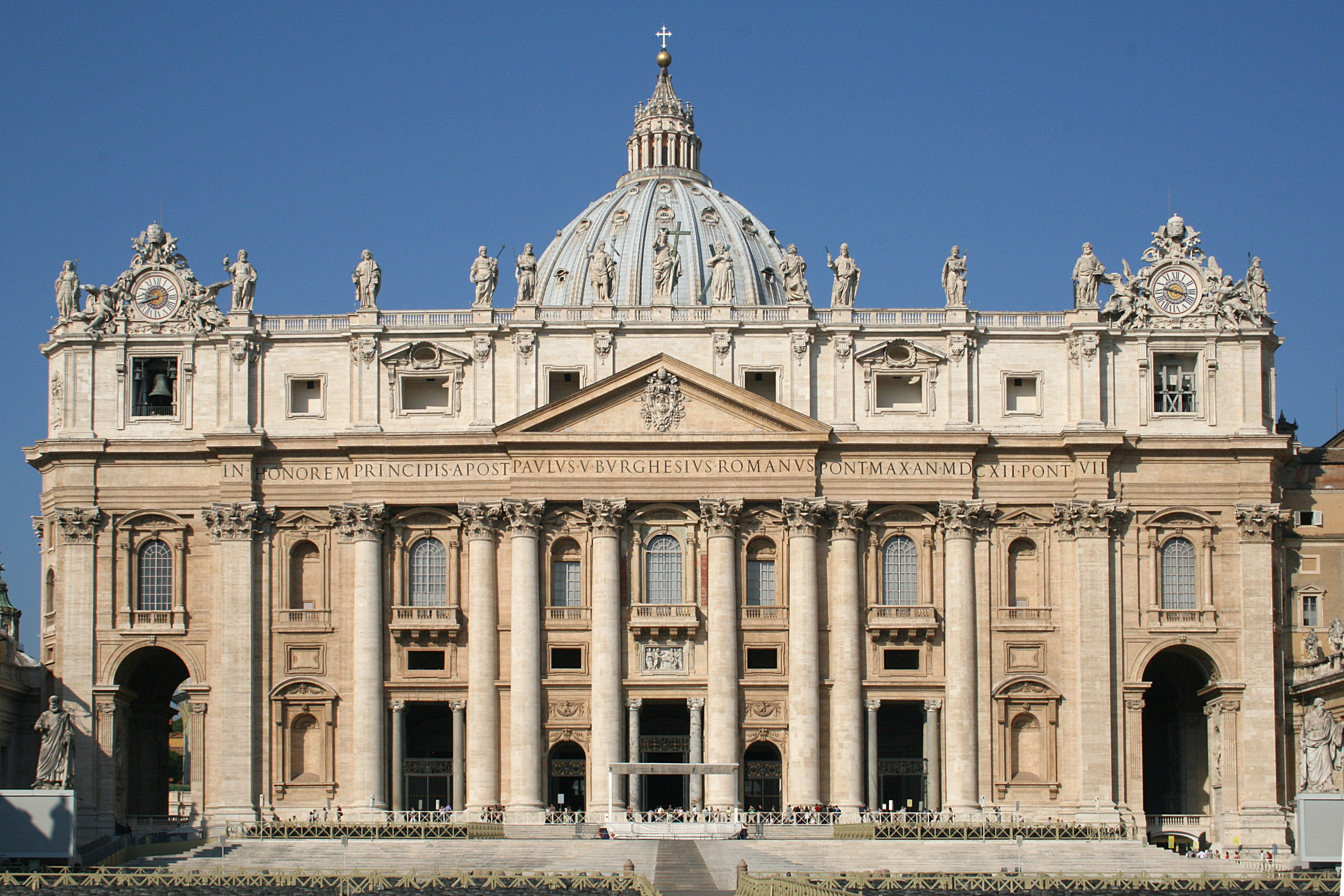
St. Peter’s Basilica

One of Pope Julius II’s largest and most well known commissions was the reconstruction of St. Peter’s Basilica, beginning in 1506. When Julius took the papal office, the condition of the Church was extremely poor, and he took the opportunity to expand it, modernize it, and leave his impression forever on the Vatican. Julius hired Donato Bramante to design the Basilica, a prominent architect and artist of the day. This was seen as a surprise move at the time, many thought Giuliano da Sangallo was the front runner for the commission. Della Rovere wanted the splendor of the new basilica to inspire awe in the masses, produce support for Catholicism and prove to his enemies he was a pious and devoted man. Bramante not only would fulfill these expectations with his design, but also with his character, which may explain why della Rovere chose him over Sangallo. "Bramante wanted to build a Basilica that would 'surpass in beauty, invention, art and design, as well as in grandeur, richness and adornment all the buildings that had been erected in that city'" (Scotti, 47).

Raphael came to work for the Pope because of his friendship with Bramante. Bramante had been in Rome working for the Pope when he sent a letter to Raphael telling him that he had convinced Julius to allow Raphael to paint the Stanza della Segnatura. Raphael who had been working on other commissions in Florence immediately dropped his projects and moved to Rome to work for the Pope, but when he arrived he found many great artists painting in the Stanza della Segnatura. When he finished the Vatican Library, he amazed Julius II so much that according to Vasari he chose "to destroy all the scenes painted by other masters from the past and present, so that Raphael alone would be honored above all those who labored on the paints which had been done up to that time"(Vasari, 314).

== Motivation behind Julius II's patronage ==
Generally, scholars have taken one of two sides regarding the many magnificent commissions of Julius II. The first, more widely accepted viewpoint is that Julius was an extravagant patron. He was known by scholars to be a patron purely for selfish motives, imposing aspirations, and a grandiose self-image. (Gosman, 43). Scholars accept that the probable and foremost reason was that it would be a way to forever leave his mark on the Catholic Church.

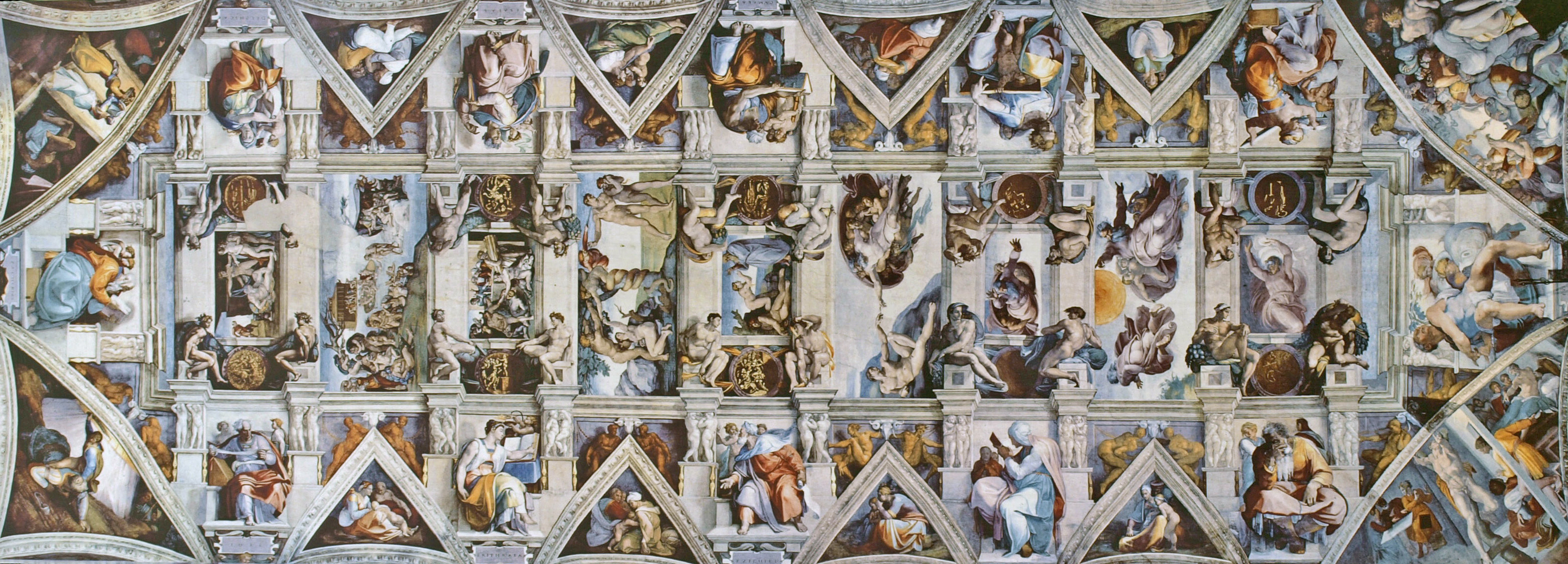
The Sistine Chapel ceiling by Michelangelo, "an artistic vision without precedent"

Many argue that Julius was using art to further extend his own Papacy, as well as the role of Popes to come. Julius II’s Papacy is frequently criticized, for it is a common conception that he was keen for glory, which is reflective in his nickname, "The Warrior Pope" (Gosman, 50). The Pope was extremely proud and aspired to be remembered as one of the greatest popes in history. Building Saint Peter’s Basilica, the largest church in the world, certainly added to the Pope’s résumé.

Many also criticize Julius II for having repeatedly identified himself with Julius Caesar. His desire to emulate Caesar and his extravagant patronage further the negative connotations. Scholars have drawn this conclusion from the medal Julius had made for Saint Peter's with himself on the back, as well as his self-chosen name of Julius. (Gosman, 44) The second, less common stance, is that Julius’s main motive for his patronage was for his own personal aesthetic pleasure (Gosman, 45). One scholar defends Julius II's patronage by stating:

It must not be forgotten that not all messages conveyed in works commissioned by a patron, let alone those merely addressed to him, can be read as a communication by the patron of his thinking and claims and aspirations. To say this is not to deny that messages may be read into them, but it should not be assumed that patrons would necessarily have cared about or understood or been motivated by theories and statements about their power and authority that may be coded into the works of art they paid for. (Gosman, 61)

Some scholars argue that these works can not be literally taken as a guide to the ideas of the Pope himself. These scholars point out that it was not solely the patron pulling the strings behind these imposing works of art, but a group of people working together. For example, Julius appears in several of Raphael’s frescoes, and it is known that he approved his placement in them. However, many modern scholars interpret this fact to mean that Julius simply desired to be painted in the frescoes. (Gosman, 55) Julius was, according to some scholars, a man who appreciated art, took pleasure in building, and merely wanted to create grand places in which to live, and that this motivation was much more important than the desire to project political ideas and images of his power. (Gosman, 55)

== Bibliography ==
- "Cappella Sistina." Lubilaeum. 8 Dec. 1994. 5 Feb. 2007 <https://web.archive.org/web/19970124121504/http://www.christusrex.org/www1/sistine/0-Tour.html>.
- De Tolnay, Charles. Michelangelo, Vol. IV: The Tomb of Julius II. Princeton: Princeton University P, 1945.
- Felix, Gilbert. The Pope, His Banker, and Venice. President and Fellows of Harvard College, 1980.
- Frank, Isabelle (1996). "Cardinal Giuliano della Rovere and Melozzo da Forli at SS. Apostoli". Zeitschrift für Kunstgeschichte. 59 (1). Deutscher Kunstverlag: 97–122. doi:10.2307/1482788. ISSN 0044-2992. JSTOR 1482788.
- Goldwaite, Richard A. Wealth and the Demand for Art in Italy, 1300–1600. Baltimore: The Johns Hopkins University P, 1993.
- Gosman, Martin, ed. "The Patronage of Pope Julius II." Princes and Princely Culture 1450–1650. Danvers, MA: Koniklijke Brill NV, 2005. 43–61.
- Hall, Marcia, ed. Raphael's School of Athens. Cambridge: Cambridge University P, 1997.
- Hersey, George L. High Renaissance Art in St. Peter's and the Vatican. Chicago: The University of Chicago P.
- Hoover, Sharon R. "Pope Julius II." Tour of Italy. May 1999. 5 Feb. 2007 <http://touritaly.org/magazine/people01/jul01.htm>.
- Jokinen, Anniina. "Julius II." Luminarium. 15 Mar. 2003. 5 Feb. 2007 <http://www.luminarium.org/encyclopedia/julius2.htm>.
- King, Ross. Michelangelo and the Pope's Ceiling. London: Chatto and Windus, 2002.
- Minnich, Nelson H. "Julius II (1503–13)." The Great Popes Through History. Ed. Frank J. Coppa. 1 vols. Westport: Greenwood P, 2002.
- Partridge, Loren, and Randolph Starn. A Renaissance Likeness. London: University of California P, 1980.
- Pastor, Ludwig. The History of the Popes, from the close of the Middle Ages, Vol. VI, 2nd ed. St. Louis: Kegan Paul, Trench, Trubner, and Co., Ltd., 1902.
- "Pope Julius II." Who 2? 5 Feb. 2007 <http://www.who2.com/juliusii.html>.
- Reynolds, Christopher. Papa; Patronage and the Music of St. Peter's, 1380–1513. Berkeley: University of California P, 1995.
- Scotti, R.a. Basilica the Splendor and the Scandal: Building St. Peter's. New York, NY: Penguin Group, 2006.
- Shaw, Christine. "The Patronage of Pope Julius II." Princes and Princely Culture 1450–1650 2 (2005): 43–61.
- Shaw, Christine. Julius II: The Warrior Pope. Cambridge MA: Blackwell Publishers, 1993.
- Vasari, Giorgio. The Lives of the Artists. Trans. Julia C. Bondanella and Peter Bondanella. Oxford: Oxford UP, 1991.
- Verstegen, Ian, ed. Patronage and Dynasty: The Rise of the Della Rovere in Renaissance Italy. Missouri: Truman State University P, 2007.
- Weiss, Roberto (1965). "The Medals of Pope Julius II (1503-1513)". Journal of the Warburg and Courtauld Institutes. 28. Warburg Institute: 163–82. doi:10.2307/750668. ISSN 0075-4390. JSTOR 750668. S2CID 195039590.
- Zucker, Mark J. (1977). "Raphael and the Beard of Pope Julius II". The Art Bulletin. 59 (4). College Art Association: 524–33. doi:10.2307/3049707. ISSN 0004-3079. JSTOR 3049707.
