= Moses (Michelangelo) =

Sculpture by Michelangelo

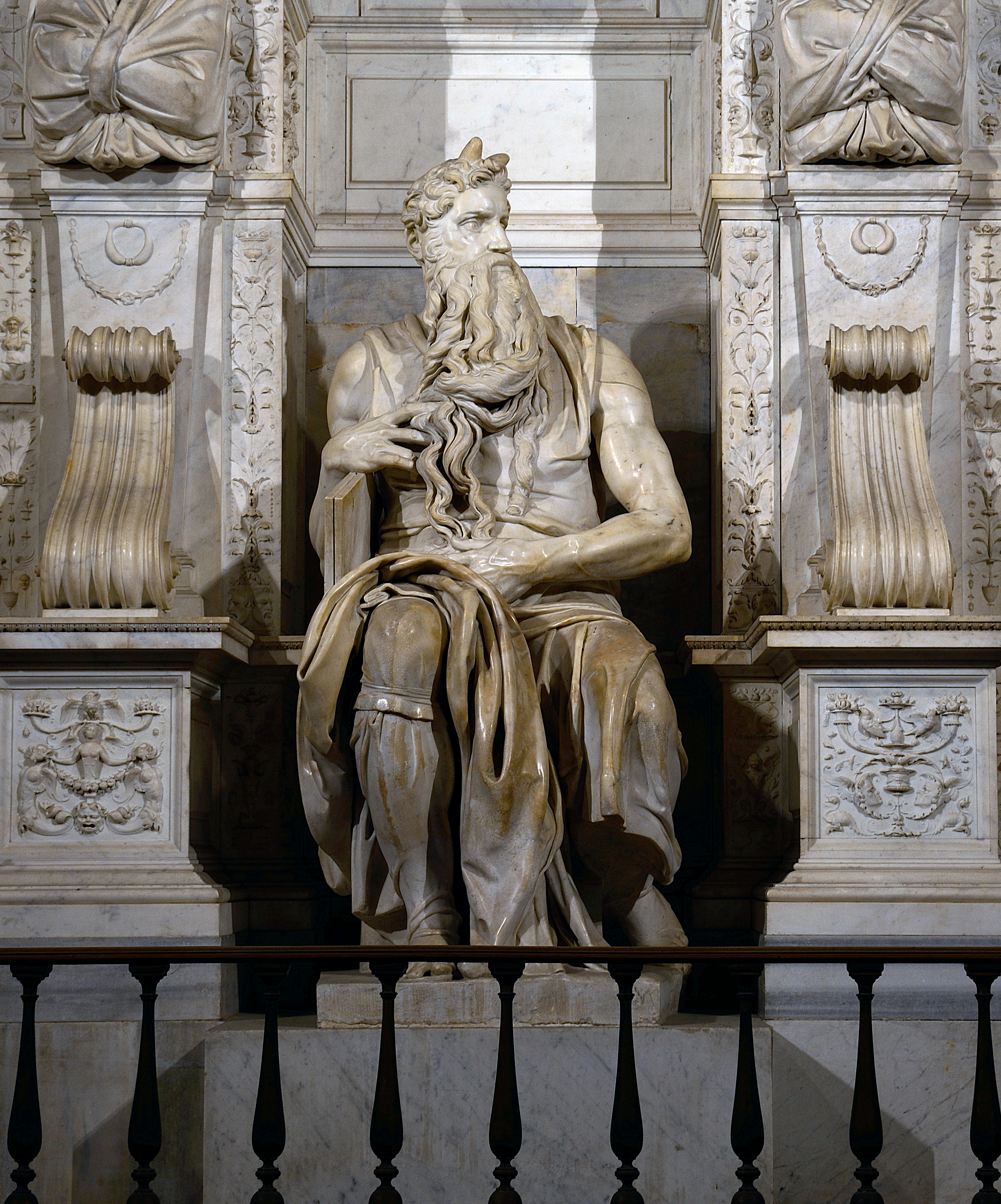
- Artist: Michelangelo
- Year: c. 1513–1515
- Medium: Marble sculpture
- Movement: Renaissance
- Subject: Biblical Moses
- Dimensions: 235 cm × 210 cm (92.5 in × 82.6 in)
- Location: San Pietro in Vincoli, Rome; 41°53′37.58″N 12°29′35.9″E
- Preceded by: Tomb of Pope Julius II
- Followed by: Rebellious Slave

Moses (Italian: Mosè [moˈzɛ]; c. 1513–1515) is a sculpture by the Italian High Renaissance artist Michelangelo, housed in the Basilica of San Pietro in Vincoli in Rome. Commissioned in 1505 by Pope Julius II for his tomb, it depicts the biblical figure Moses with horns on his head, based on a description in chapter 34 of Exodus in the Vulgate, the Latin translation of the Bible used at that time. Some scholars believe the use of horns may often hold an antisemitic implication, while others hold that it is simply a convention based on the translation error.

Sigmund Freud's interpretations of the statue from 1916 are particularly well-known. Some interpretations of the sculpture, including Freud's, note a demonic force, but also a beautiful figure, with emotional intensity as God's word is revealed. The delicacy of some of the features such as Moses' flowing hair are seen as a remarkable technical achievement, but Freud argues that Michelangelo goes beyond mere skills to provoke curiosity in the viewer, asking why Moses plays with his hair, and why he is presented with horns and flowing hair.

== Commissioning and history ==
Pope Julius II commissioned Michelangelo to build his tomb in 1505 and it was finally completed in 1545; Julius II died in 1513. The initial design by Michelangelo was massive and called for over 40 statues. The statue of Moses would have been placed on a tier about 3.74 meters high (12 ft 3 in), opposite a figure of St. Paul. In the final design, the statue of Moses sits in the center of the bottom tier.

== Description ==
Giorgio Vasari in the "Life of Michelangelo" wrote: "Michelangelo finished the Moses in marble, a statue of five braccia, unequaled by any modern or ancient work. Seated in a serious attitude, he rests with one arm on the tablets, and with the other holds his long glossy beard, the hairs, so difficult to render in sculpture, being so soft and downy that it seems as if the iron chisel must have become a brush. The beautiful face, like that of a saint and mighty prince, seems as one regards it to need the veil to cover it, so splendid and shining does it appear, and so well has the artist presented in the marble the divinity with which God had endowed that holy countenance. The draperies fall in graceful folds, the muscles of the arms and bones of the hands are of such beauty and perfection, as are the legs and knees, the feet were adorned with excellent shoes, that Moses may now be called the friend of God more than ever, since God has permitted his body to be prepared for the resurrection before the others by the hand of Michelangelo. The Jews still go every Saturday in troops to visit and adore it as a divine, not a human thing."

The English translation of Sigmund Freud's "The Moses of Michelangelo" also provides a basic description of the sculpture: "The Moses of Michelangelo is represented as seated; his body faces forward, his head with its mighty beard looks to the left, his right foot rests on the ground, and his left leg is raised so that only the toes touch the ground. His right arm links the Tables of the Law with something that looks like a book in the right palm of his hand with a portion of his beard; his left arm lies in his lap."

Jonathan Jones of the English newspaper, The Guardian, provides another description: "Moses's right hand protects the stone tablets bearing the Commandments; his left hand, veins throbbing, muscles tense, appears to be holding back from the violent action. When he came down from Mount Sinai, Moses found his people worshipping the Golden Calf – the false idol they had made. His anger defies the prison of stone, the limits of the sculptor's art. Few can resist the impression of a real mind, real emotions, in the figure that glares from his marble seat. Today, he glares at the tourists who mob the church of San Pietro in Vincoli, Rome. He outfaces them, just as he outfaced Sigmund Freud, who spent three weeks in 1913 trying to figure out the sculpture's emotional effect. Moses's vitality has made this work popular since the 16th century; according to Vasari, Rome's Jewish population adopted the statue as their own. Its power must have something to do with the rendition of things that should be impossible to depict in stone; most quirkily, the beard – so ropy and smoky, its coils gave fantastic, snaking life. But where others might astonish us with technique, Michelangelo goes beyond this, leading us from formal to intellectual surprise, making us wonder why Moses fondles his beard, why Michelangelo has used this river of hair – in combination with the horns that were a conventional attribute of Moses – to give him an inhuman, demonic aspect."

== Interpretations ==
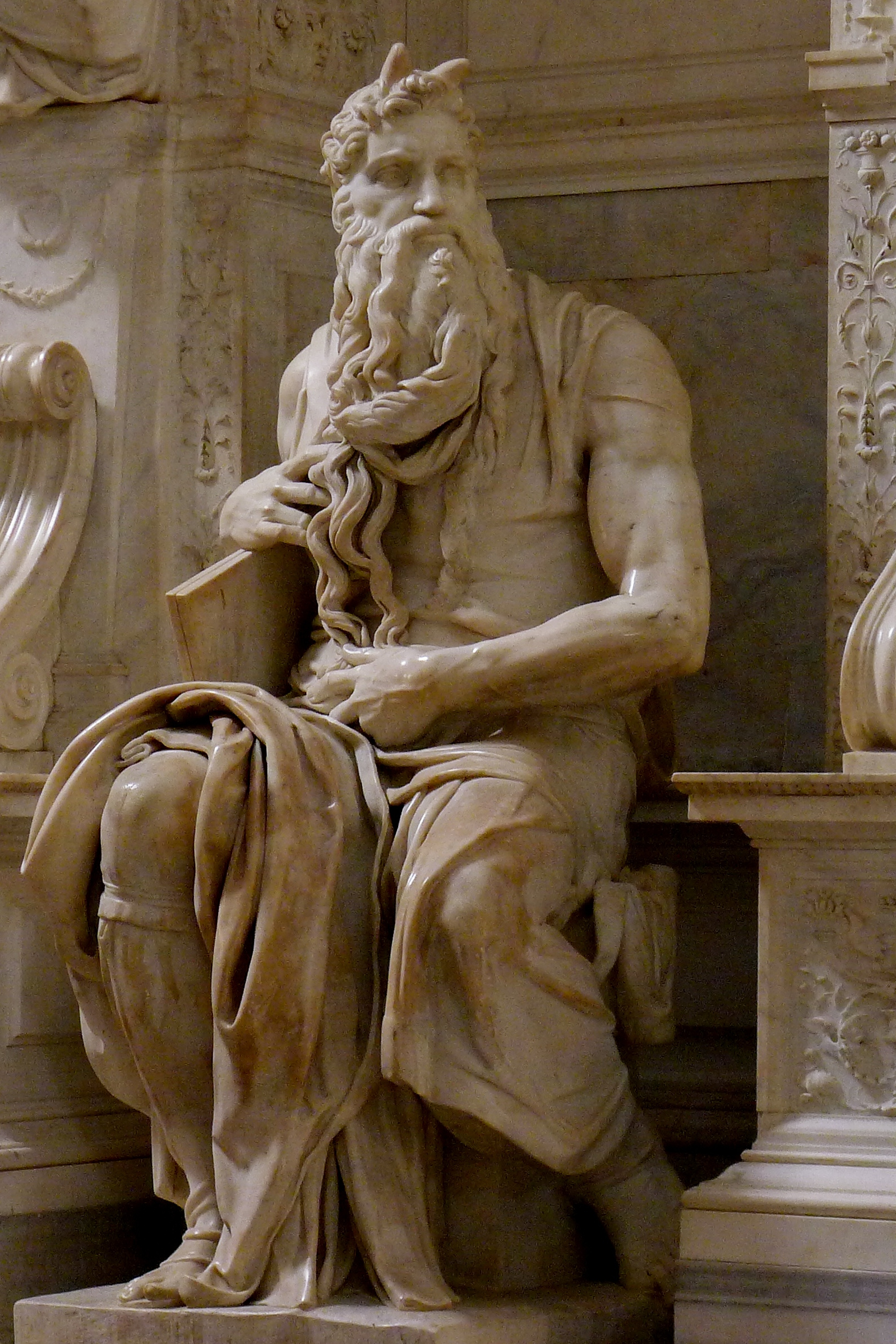
Michelangelo's Moses

In his 1914 essay entitled "The Moses of Michelangelo", Sigmund Freud associates the moment in the biblical narrative when Moses descends from the mountain the first time, carrying the tablets, and finds the Hebrew people worshipping the Golden Calf, as described in Exodus 32. Freud describes Moses in a complex psychological state:

We may now, I believe, permit ourselves to reap the fruits of our endeavors. We have seen how many of those who have felt the influence of this statue has been compelled to interpret it as representing Moses agitated by the spectacle of his people fallen from grace and dancing round an idol. But this interpretation had to be given up, for it made us expect to see him spring up in the next moment, break the Tables and accomplish the work of vengeance. Such a conception, however, would fail to harmonize with the design of making this figure, together with three (or five) more seated figures, a part of the tomb of Julius II. We may now take up again the abandoned interpretation, for the Moses we have reconstructed will neither leap up nor cast the Tables from him. What we see before us is not the inception of violent action but the remains of a movement that has already taken place. In his first transport of fury, Moses desired to act, to spring up and take vengeance and forget the Tables; but he has overcome the temptation, and he will now remain seated and still, in his frozen wrath and his pain mingled with contempt. Nor will he throw away the Tables so that they will break on the stones, for it is on their particular account that he has controlled his anger; it was to preserve them that he kept his passion in check. In giving way to his rage and indignation, he had to neglect the Tables, and the hand which upheld them was withdrawn. They began to slide down and were in danger of being broken. This brought him to himself. He remembered his mission and for its sake renounced an indulgence of his feelings. His hand returned and saved the unsupported Tables before they had fallen to the ground. In this attitude, he remained immobilized, and in this attitude, Michelangelo has portrayed him as the guardian of the tomb. As our eyes travel down it, the figure exhibits three distinct emotional strata. The lines of the face reflect the feelings which have won the ascendancy; the middle of the figure shows the traces of suppressed movement, and the foot still retains the attitude of the projected action. It is as though the controlling influence had proceeded downwards from above. No mention has been made so far of the left arm, and it seems to claim a share in our interpretation. The hand is laid in the lap in a mild gesture and holds as though in a caress the end of the flowing beard. It seems as if it is meant to counteract the violence with which the other hand had misused the beard a few moments ago.

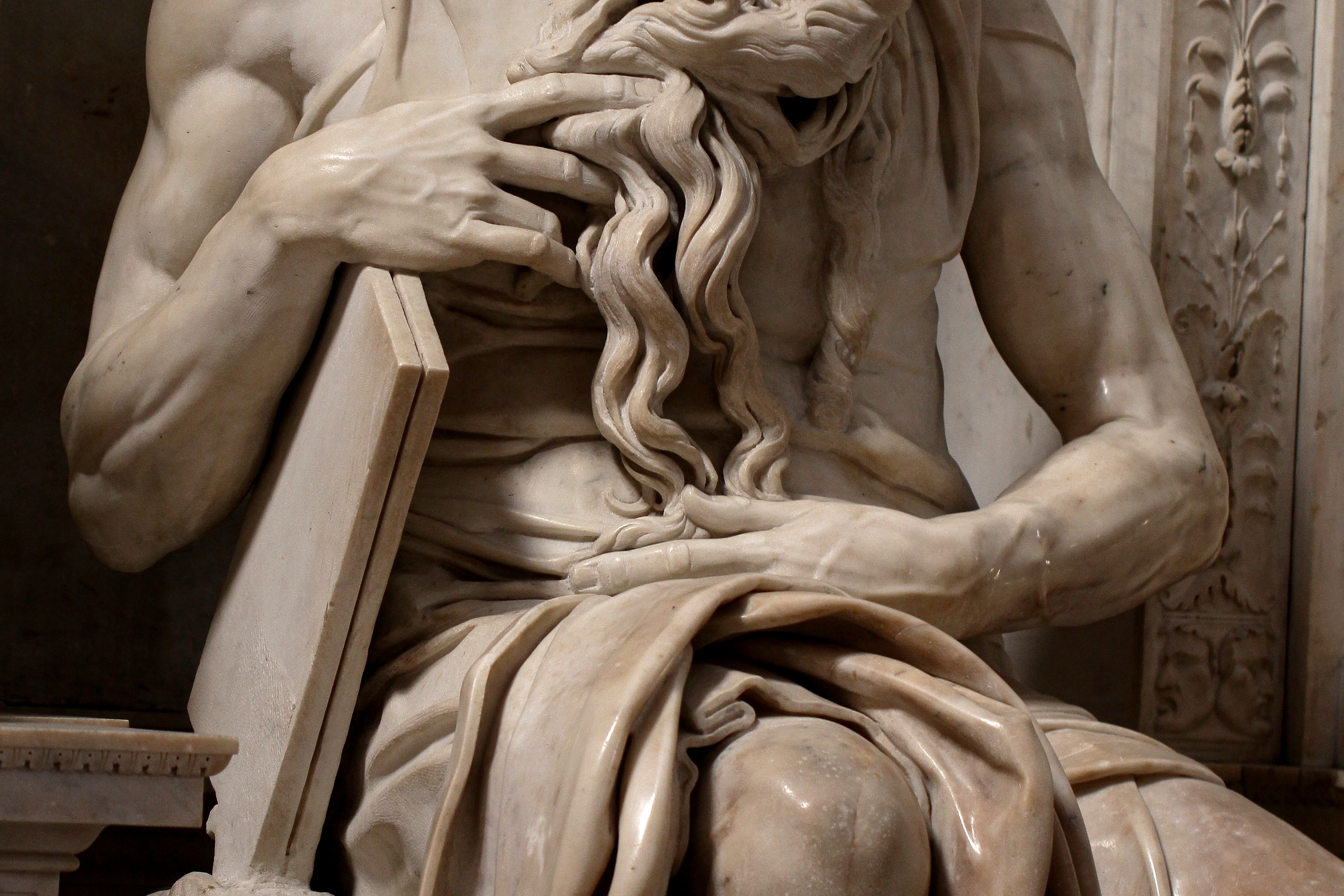
Michelangelo's Moses, detail

Another view, put forward by Malcolm Macmillan and Peter J. Swales in their essay, "Observations from the Refuse-Heap: Freud, Michelangelo's Moses, and Psychoanalysis", relates the sculpture to the second set of Tables and the events mentioned in Exodus 33 and 34. They note that Moses is holding blank tablets, which God had commanded Moses to make in preparation for the second giving of the Law; they also note that Moses is depicted with "horns" which the biblical texts describe Moses as having only after he returned to the Hebrew people after the second giving of the Law. They argue that the statue depicts the moment when Moses sees God, as described in Exodus 33: "The incident in question is the most significant part of the Old Testament story of the exodus. Moses, full of doubt about his own standing and that of his people, takes the considerable risk of requesting—even demanding—that they are forgiven, that he be granted the Lord's grace, and that the Lord resume his place and lead them to the Promised Land. Emboldened by his success, he then risks all by asking that the Lord reveal his glory. Little imagination is required to sense the intense emotion with which such a Moses would have awaited the Lord: Will he come? Will he renew the Covenant? Will he reveal his glory?" They further argue that both Paul and Moses experienced God directly, an idea and pairing that were important to the Florentine Neo-Platonists, a group that the authors view both Michelangelo and Pope Julius II as being akin to. Finally, the authors state the key emotion on Moses' face is "awe at being face to face with the creator."

=== Tensions between Michelangelo and Julius II ===
Some interpretations, including those of Freud, refer to the tensions between Julius II, who commissioned his tomb from Michelangelo, and the artist. Freud claimed that Moses functions as a reproach both to Julius and the artist. Bertman notes that Julius II was frequently bearded, which had been unknown among Popes for a millennium, and that there may be physical similarities between the statue and Julius.

=== Shining face interpreted as horns ===
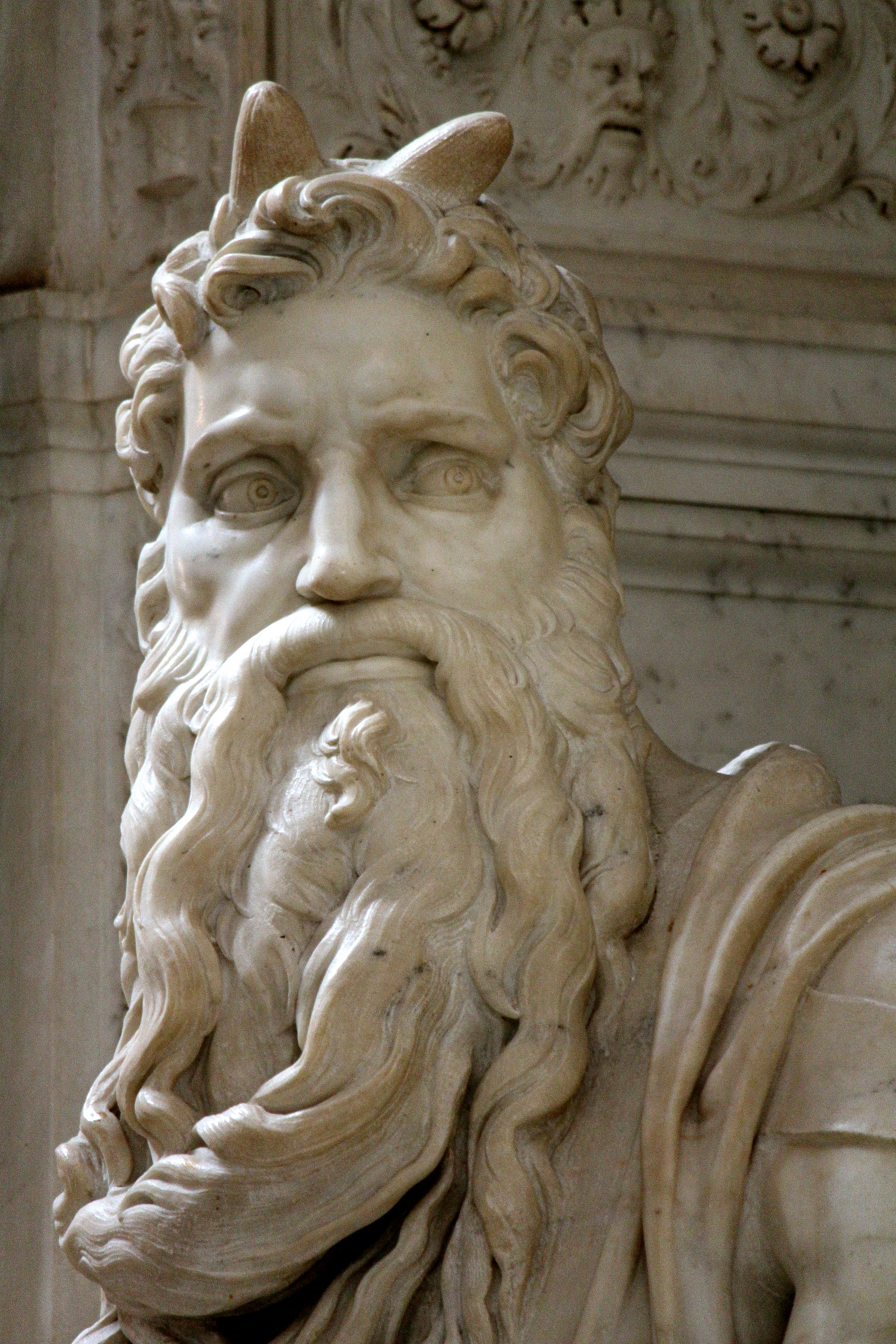
Detail of the statue's bicorned head

Following the iconographic convention common in Latin Christianity, the statue has two horns on its head. The depiction of a horned Moses stems from the description of Moses' face as "cornuta" ("horned") in the Latin Vulgate translation of the passage found at Exodus chapter 34, specifically verses 29, 30 and 35, in which Moses returns to the people after receiving the commandments for the second time. Some modern scholars contend that medieval theologians believed that Jerome had intended to express a glorification of Moses' face, by his use of the Latin word for "horned." and that this understanding that the original Hebrew was difficult and was not likely to mean "horns" persisted into and through the Renaissance.

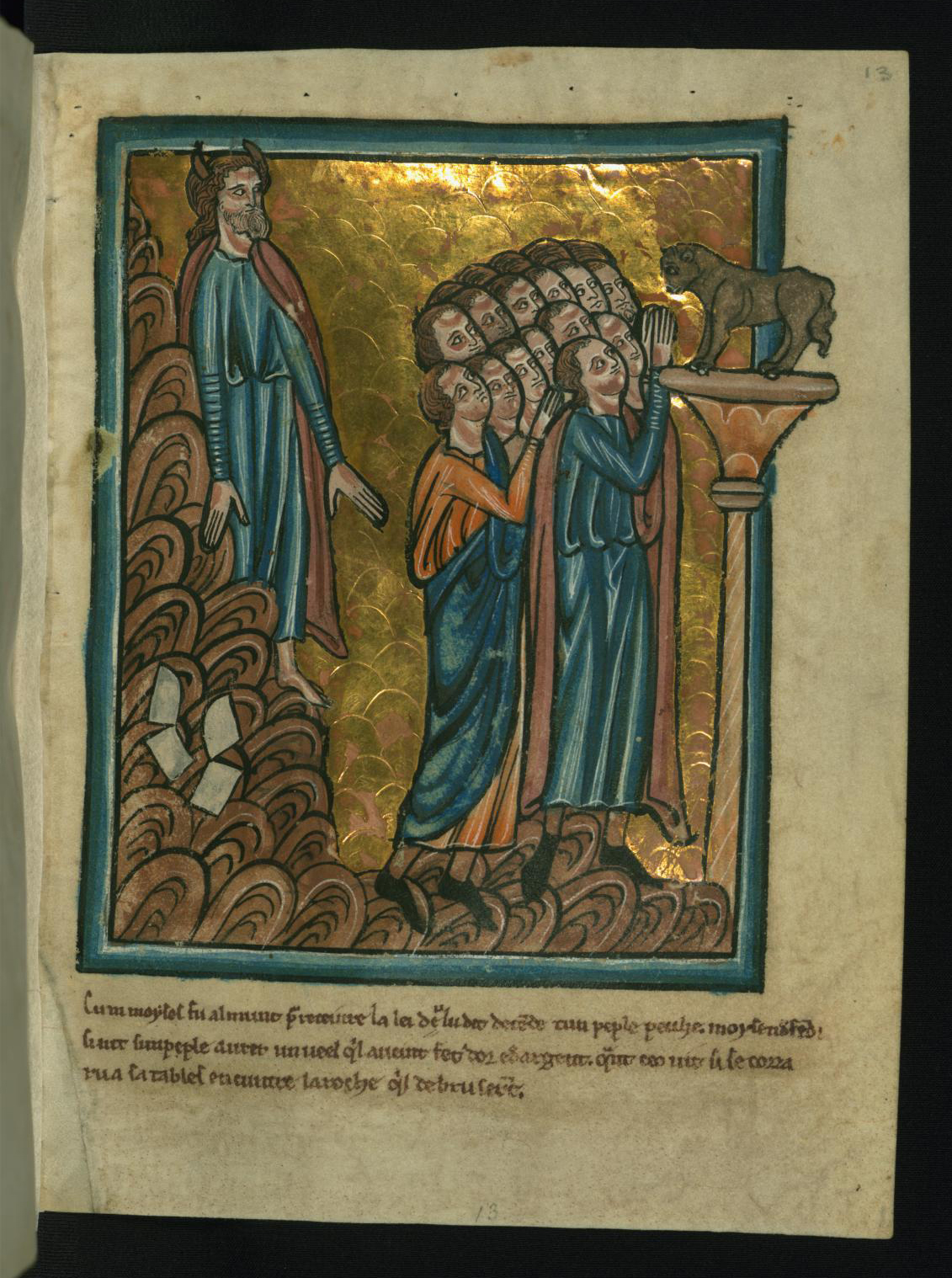
Illustration of Moses with horns from a 13th-century illuminated manuscript

Classicist Stephen Bertman argues that Jerome is known himself to hold antisemitic views, and may have made the choice to associate Moses with "horns" consciously for theological reasons, expecting his readers to have in mind the New Testament association of horns with devils, wild beasts and the antichrist. In the Christian art of the Middle Ages depicting Moses with horns, this is sometimes done to depict him in glory, as a prophet and precursor of Jesus, but also in negative contexts, especially about Pauline contrasts between faith and law; the iconography was not clear-cut.

Art historian Ruth Mellinkoff argues that while the horns of Moses in origin were in no way associated with those of the Devil, the horns may nevertheless have developed a negative connotation with the development of anti-Jewish sentiment in the medieval and early modern period. Associations in images between Jews and devils were frequently made, and Jews were sometimes portrayed as having horns. Bertman views the statue itself as being a negative portrayal of Moses, building on these perceptions. The statue is argued by art historian Jennifer Koosed as being the culmination of the horned Moses tradition, mixing animal and human qualities to present the divine.

A book published in 2008 advanced a theory that the "horns" on Michelangelo's statue were never meant to be seen and that it is wrong to interpret them as horns: "[The statue] never had horns. The artist had planned Moses as a masterpiece not only of sculpture but also of special optical effects worthy of any Hollywood movie. For this reason, the piece had to be elevated and facing straight forward, looking in the direction of the front door of the basilica. The two protrusions on the head would have been invisible to the viewer looking up from the floor below – the only thing that would have been seen was the light reflected off of them." This interpretation has been contested.

== Casts and reproductions ==
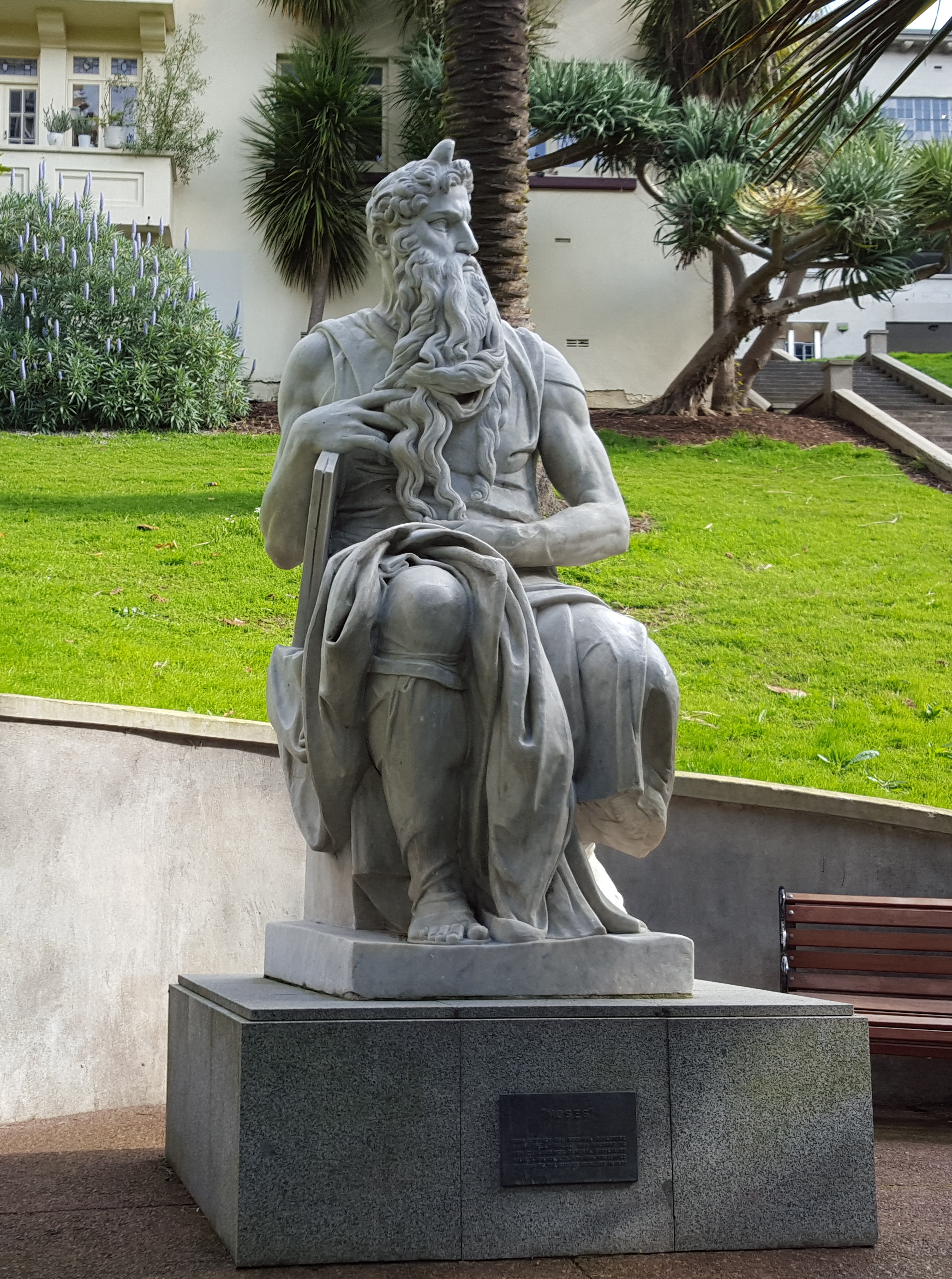
A replica of the statue in Myers Park, Auckland, New Zealand

In 1931, Vojislav Veljković, a former Minister of Finance of the Kingdom of Yugoslavia, known as "the father of the Yugoslav golden Dinar", and an avid art collector, petitioned Pope Pius XI to use the lost-wax method to have bronze casts of 21 of Michelangelo's original sculptures, including Moses, produced. The Pope's approval was granted on the condition that Veljković would fashion a suitable space with a climate control system that would ensure the internal temperature would be kept within one degree Celsius throughout the year, thus preventing deformation of the bronze over time. Veljković initiated the construction a modern exhibition pavilion in the courtyard of his family house in Belgrade, the capital of the Kingdom of Yugoslavia, resulting in the first private museum in Southeast Europe. He named it Museo, though it would later become colloquially known as the Veljković Pavilion. The building also featured the first modern HVAC system installed in Southeast Europe.

Once the Pope approved the petition, the Paris foundry Susse Frères was commissioned to produce the casts, and the certificates of authenticity were issued by the Vatican. Unfortunately, Veljković died before the new museum was opened in 1934, but his brother Jovan saw the project through.

Museo was opened to the public twice a week. In addition to the cast of Moses, the museum exhibited over 250 other art pieces, including casts of four other Michelangelo originals—Day, Night, Dying Slave, and Rebellious Slave—a number of paintings by Uroš Predić, Paja Jovanović, Sava Šumanović, Nadežda Petrović, and Marko Murat, a set of caricatures by Beta Vukanović, a cast of Jean-Antoine Houdon's Voltaire, as well as a number of antique sculptures.

The Axis invasion of Yugoslavia in World War II led to the closure of Museo. During the occupation, the Germans did not plunder the collection.

After the war and the Communist takeover of Yugoslavia, the museum and the art pieces were nationalized by the state. The building was first given as an atelier to Moše Pijade, then to the sculptor Sreten Stojanović, and eventually converted to a shoe and leather storage by the Municipality of Savski Venac. All the paintings from the collection, as well as a few statues, went missing during this period. The bronze casts of Michelangelo's works were transferred to the Academy of Fine Arts, which later evolved into the Faculty of Fine Arts of the University of Arts in Belgrade. They were stored at Toma Rosandić's workshop in the Topčider neighborhood. The location would later become the seat of the sculpture department of the Faculty of Fine Arts. Today, the cast of Moses is still on display there.

In 1971, a reproduction of the statue was unveiled at Myers Park in Auckland, New Zealand, purchased by the Milne & Choyce department store.

== See also ==
- List of works by Michelangelo
- Art patronage of Julius II
