= Horns of Moses =

Iconographic convention

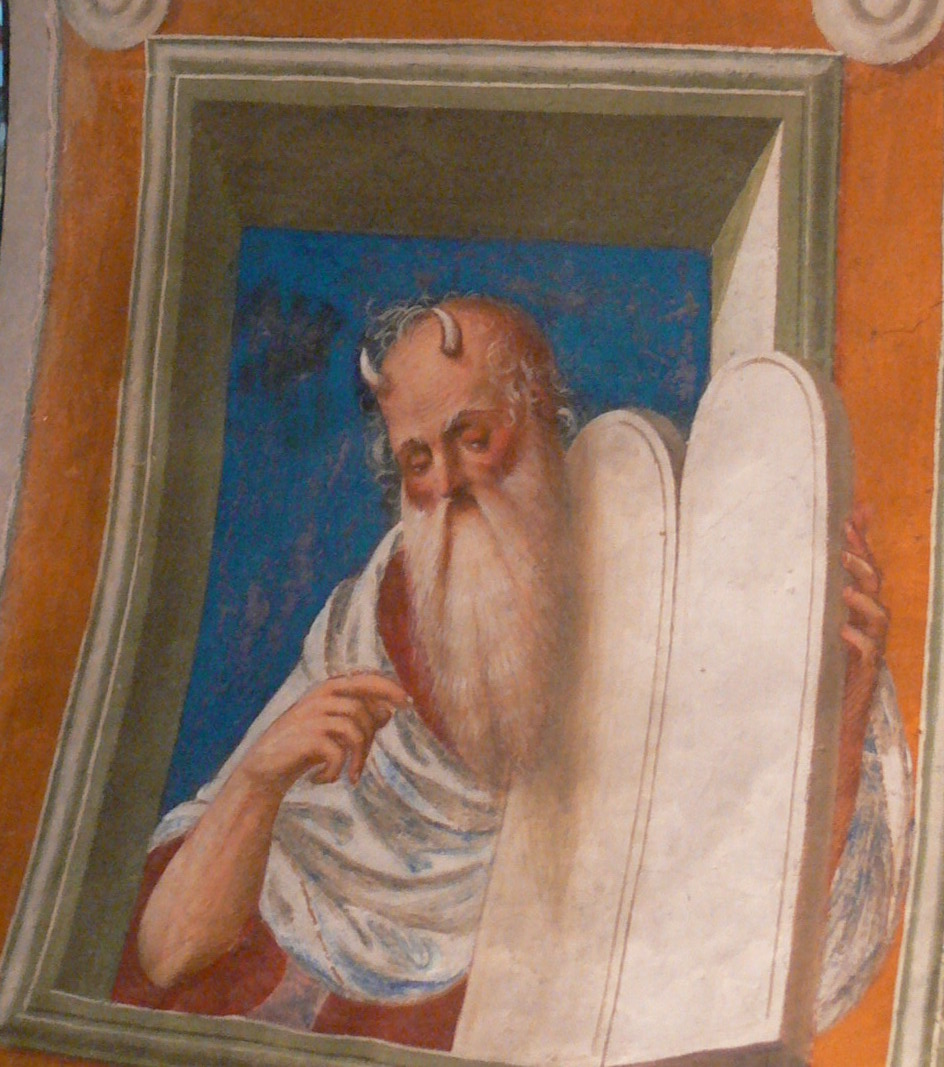
Italian fresco, c. 1500

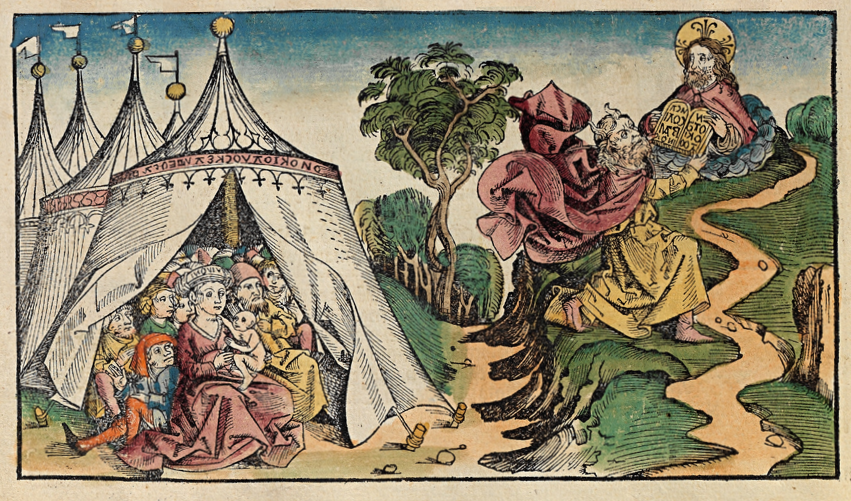
Moses receiving the Ten Commandments, Nuremberg Chronicles, 1493, woodcut with colour

The Horns of Moses are an iconographic convention common in Latin Christianity whereby Moses was presented as having two horns on his head, later replaced by rays of light. The idea comes from a translation, or mistranslation, of a Hebrew term in Jerome's Latin Vulgate Bible, and many later vernacular translations dependent on that. Moses is said to be "horned", or radiant, or glorified, after he sees God who presents him with the tablets of the law in the Book of Exodus.

The use of the term "horned" to describe Moses in fact predates Jerome, and can be traced to the Greek Jewish scholar Aquila of Sinope (fl. 130), whose Greek translations were well known to Jerome. The Hebrew qāran may reflect an allegorical concept of "glorified", or rings of light. Horns tend to have positive associations in the Old Testament, and in ancient Middle Eastern culture more widely, but are associated with negative forces in the Book of Revelation in the New Testament. These considerations may have influenced the translators in their choices, for Aquila as a positive, or for Jerome, as a negative.

Moses with horns probably first appears in visual depictions in the eleventh century. These portrayals continue to compete with unhorned depictions of Moses through the medieval and Renaissance periods. Many are clearly positive depictions, as a prophet and precursor to Jesus. Other depictions of Moses, horned and unhorned, are likely to have had antisemitic connotations, especially in the later medieval period, for example, on the Hereford Mappa Mundi. Associations between Jews and devils were established, and a belief that Jews possessed horns developed, including through the badges or hats featuring horns they were mandated to wear; it may have been hard for the images of a horned Moses and the "horned" Jew to have been kept apart in the popular imagination. Horned Moses iconography may have reinforced the idea that Jews have horns.

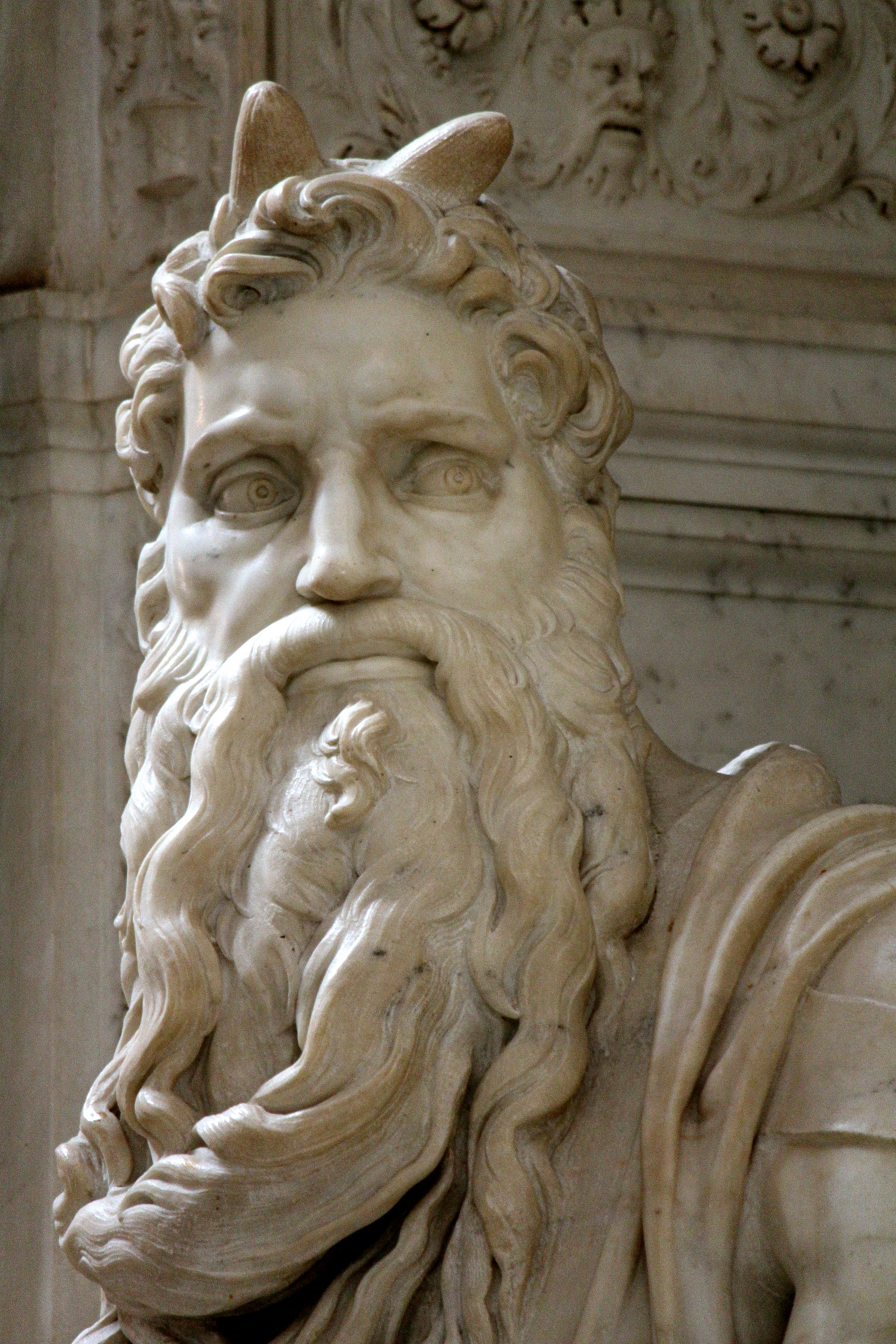
Michelangelo's Moses, detail of the horned head

Michelangelo's horned Moses of c. 1513–1515 comes at the end of the tradition of this depiction, and is generally seen as a positive depiction of the prophet, if containing an animalistic or demonic element. Awareness of flaws in the Vulgate translation spread in the later Middle Ages, and by about 1500 it was realized in scholarly circles that "horned" was a mistranslation. Horns were often replaced by two bunches of rays of light, springing from the same parts of the head, as seen in the 1481–1482 Moses frescoes in the Sistine Chapel or on the 1544 Mosesbrunnen fountain in Bern, Switzerland. These remained common until the 19th century. Artists often ignored the idea that Moses' rays were given to him when he received the tablets of the law, and by the 19th century some images of the infant Moses in scenes of the Finding of Moses feature the rays.

== Etymological origin ==
Depictions of a horned Moses stem from the description of Moses' face as "cornuta" ("horned") in the Latin Vulgate translation of the passage found at Exodus chapter 34, specifically verses 29, 30 and 35, in which Moses returns to the people after receiving the commandments for the second time. The Catholic Douay–Rheims Bible (1609) translates the Vulgate as, "And when Moses came down from the Mount Sinai, he held the two tables of the testimony, and he knew not that his face was horned from the conversation of the Lord." This was Jerome's effort to faithfully translate the difficult, original Hebrew text, which uses the term קָרַן, qāran (based on the root, קֶרֶן qeren, which often means "horn"); the term is now interpreted to mean "shining" or "emitting rays" (somewhat like horns). The Anglican King James or Authorised Version of only a few years later has no horns, but a shining face "… when he came down from the mount, that Moses wist not that the skin of his face shone while he talked with him."

The usual view in recent centuries has been that Jerome made an outright error, but it has recently been argued that Jerome regarded qeren as a metaphor for "glorified", based on other commentaries he wrote, including one on Ezekiel, where he wrote that Moses' face had "become 'glorified', or as it says in the Hebrew, 'horned'." The use of the term "horned" in fact predates Jerome, and was contained in existing translations he is known to have worked with, especially that of Aquila from Hebrew to Greek; other translations used included the alternative "glorified". Medjuck argues that "horned" is a metaphorical or allegorical concept relating to glory in both Jerome's translation and Jewish tradition, which Jerome was familiar with.

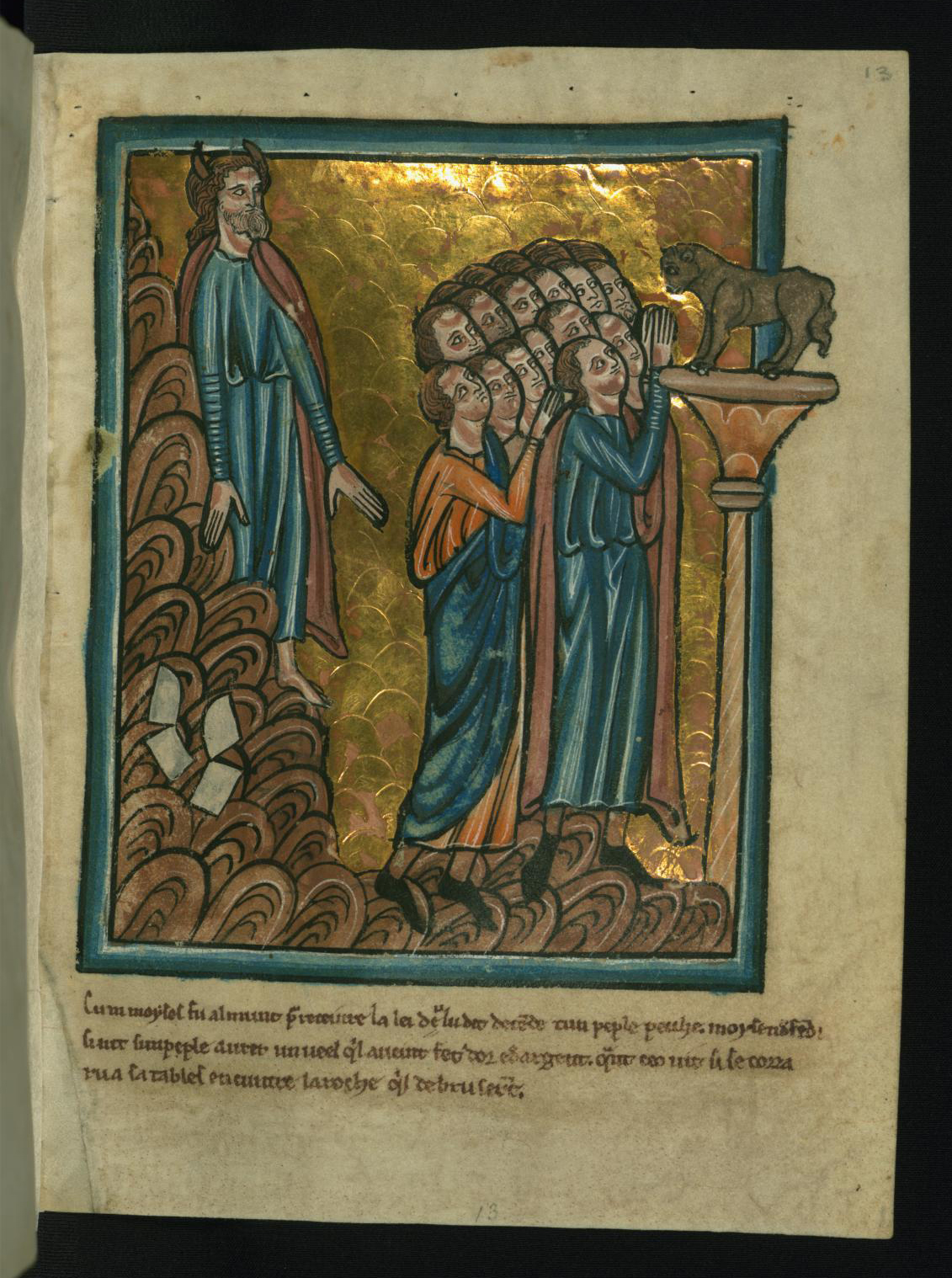
Moses with horns, with the Golden Calf, in a 13th-century illuminated manuscript, by William de Brailes

Another interpretation was that qeren also represented 'rings of light' as when Moses became enlightened after his journey. The Greek Septuagint, which Jerome also had available, translated the verse as "Moses knew not that the appearance of the skin of his face was glorified." Medieval theologians and scholars believed that Jerome had intended to express a glorification of Moses' face, by his use of the Latin word for "horned." The understanding that the original Hebrew was difficult and was not likely to actually mean "horns" developed during the Renaissance.

The cultural historian Stephen Bertman argues that Jerome is known himself to have held antisemitic views, and may have made the choice to associate Moses with "horns" consciously for theological reasons. Bertman argues that for Aquila, as a Jew, "horns" as presented in the Old Testament, would have generally positive associations, but that Jerome could have expected his readers to have in mind the New Testament association of horns with dragons, wild beasts and the antichrist in Revelation. Given that Moses was the holder of the old, now replaced, law, it may have been preferable to Jerome to portray him in a negative light. Furthermore, implying that Moses' face was "glorified" would imply an association with Jesus, and place the Old Law on a parallel with the new. Thus Bertman concludes Jerome may simply have been acting on his own biases and theological preferences.

== In medieval art ==
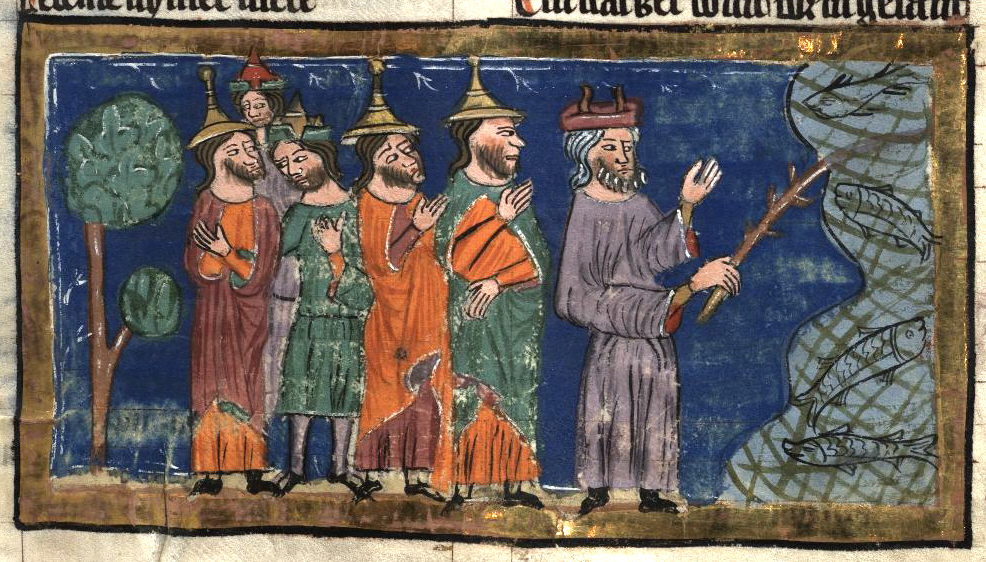
Moses strikes the rock, 1350-1375, Fulda MS of the World Chronicle by Rudolf von Ems

Although Jerome completed the Vulgate in the late 4th century, it is usually said that the first known applications in art of the literal language of the Vulgate on this point are found in numerous images in the Old English Hexateuch (British Library, Cotton MS Claudius B.iv.) a heavily illustrated manuscript of the Old English translation made before about 1050. Mellinkoff argues that English art of this period was innovative, so a new interpretation and depiction of Moses would be in keeping with other new ideas found from the period. She also argues that it is important that the depiction occurs in a vernacular text, as it is a literal depiction of the Old English translation, gehyrned, or "horned", and that Old English artists were not "scholarly", that is they were not necessariy familiar with scholarly traditions that may have led them to depict Moses differently. However, it has often been suggested that the pictures in this are derived from a much earlier manuscript then in Canterbury, and now lost. Herbert Broderick, in a monograph on the illustrations in the manuscript suggests that this ancient prototype drew on ideas about charismatic leadership current in Hellenistic Egypt, and the horns were in these images, as horns of power and holiness.

For the next century or so, evidence for further images of a horned Moses is sparse, although surviving images of him are generally few. Around 1120 he reappears in English manuscripts such as the Bury Bible and Shaftesbury Psalter, as well as an Austrian Bible. These early images respect the timing of the change in Moses' appearance, showing him without horns before he comes down Mount Sinai. Afterwards, such images proliferated and can be found, for example, in the stained glass windows at Chartres Cathedral, the Sainte-Chapelle, and Notre Dame Cathedral, even as Moses continued to be depicted many times without horns.

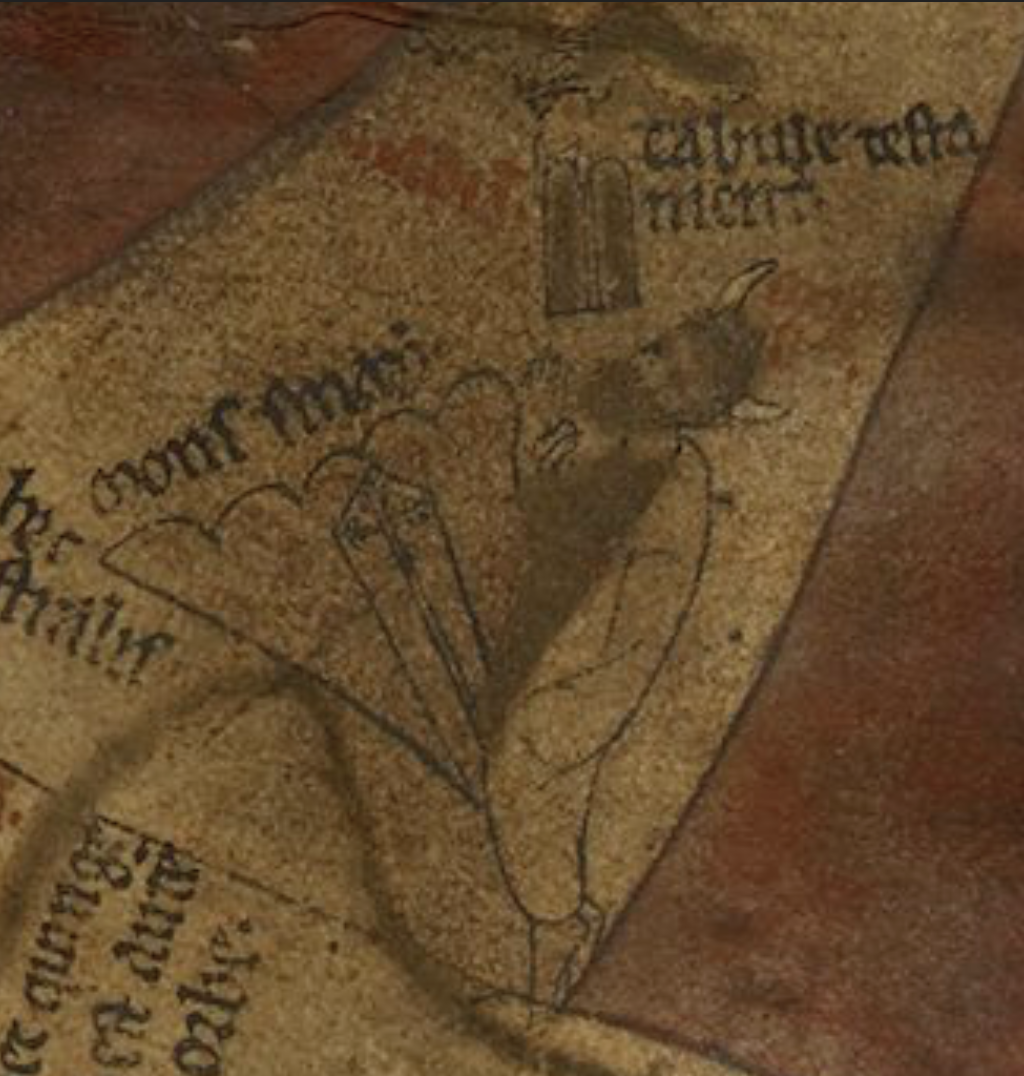
Horned Moses on the Hereford Mappa Mundi

In the Christian art of the Middle Ages depicting Moses with horns, this is sometimes done to depict him in glory, as a prophet and precursor of Jesus, but also in negative contexts, especially about Pauline contrasts between faith and law; the iconography was not clear-cut. Art historian Debra Strickland identifies the horned Moses on the Hereford Mappa Mundi as an overtly antisemitic example, which she argues is associated with the redefining the Exodus story as a defence of the 1290 Expulsion of the Jews from England. Sometimes Moses appears in a negative context with or instead of the figure of Synagoga.

Art historian Ruth Mellinkoff speculated that while the horns of Moses in origin were in no way associated with those of the Devil, the horns may nevertheless have developed a negative connotation with the development of anti-Jewish sentiment in the later medieval period. Bertman agrees that the medieval perception of Moses with horns would have acted to create associations between Moses and devils. Associations between Jews and devils in Christian antisemitic imagery were strong, and Jews were sometimes portrayed as having horns. The Jewish hats mandated in France and elsewhere, were known as the pileus cornutus (horned hat) and the badges enforced by Philip III of France seem to have incorporated a horn. It is also possible that Moses' horned figure served as a means to reinforce the belief that Jews had horns. In any case, such associations in the popular imagination would, in Bertman, Mellinkoff and Strickland's view, have overriden theological or other concerns. In the end, Moses was a Jew, could be associated with contemporary counterparts, and the same negative ideas could be applied to both.

Religious plays functioned as an important means for theological ideas to be disseminated. Stage depictions of Moses may have commonly featured him with horns. Although stage directions for him to be horned are found in only one preserved play, it may also be that it was such a normal expectation that it would have been considered unnecessary to state; and stage directions themselves are relatively uncommon. The most commonly known plays to feature Moses are based on Augustine's text Contra Judaeos, Paganos, et Arianos Sermo de Symbolo (Sermon on the Creed against the Jews, Pagans and Arians) in which Moses and other Old Testament prophets serve as witnesses to persuade Jews of their error in persisting with their beliefs.

== Renaissance and later art ==
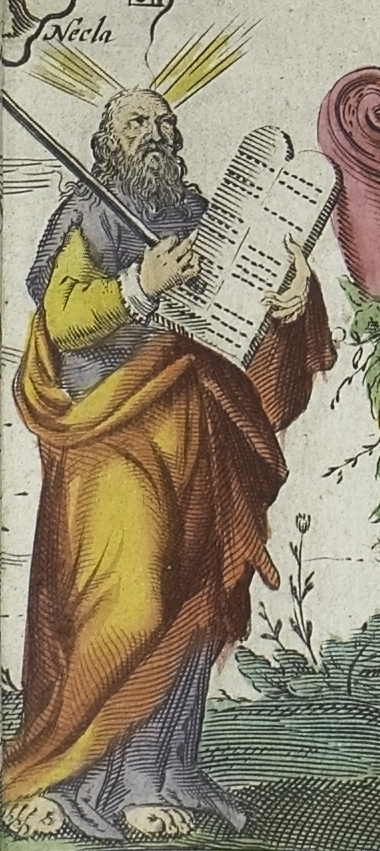
With rays, the Staff of Moses and the tablets with the Ten Commandments, mid-17th century

The most well-known depiction of Moses with horns dates to this time, in Michelangelo's Moses. Its qualities have been extensively discussed, including by Sigmund Freud. The figure is usually viewed in broadly positive terms, while containing a demonic element. Art historian Jennifer Koosed has argued that the statue is the culmination of the horned Moses tradition, mixing animal and human qualities to present the divine.

By the 16th century, the prevalence of depictions of a horned Moses steeply diminished. As Renaissance Biblical scholarship developed, awareness that "horned" was a mistranslation gradually spread, and the horns were dropped in art, often replaced by two bunches of rays of light, springing from the same parts of the head, Moses is depicted numerous times in the Life of Moses fresco cycle in the Sistine Chapel of 1481-82, all without horns, but in the last three scenes, after he receives the Commandments, he is given rays of light; the Descent from Mount Sinai is the first of these.

The Staff of Moses, which is first mentioned in the Bible during the account of the Burning bush episode, and in iconic settings the tablets with the commandments, become his usual attributes with or without the rays or horns, and together with an imposing figure and long white beard, usually make him recognisable even in crowded scenes. Another well known example is the 1544 statue on the Mosesbrunnen fountain in Bern, Switzerland, with the rays of light added in gilded metal. The presentation of Moses with rays of light reflected the usual view in rabbinical literature by this time.

The presentation of Moses with rays of light remained common until the 19th century, for example appearing in the Bible illustrations of Gustave Doré (1866). The Bible says that Moses' appearance had changed when he returned from his lengthy encounter with God on Mount Sinai, a change represented in art by the "horns" or rays. Logically, in narrative images he should only have been shown with these visible from this point in his life onwards, but artists did not always follow this and he is often shown with them in earlier episodes. By the 19th century some images of the infant Moses in scenes of the Finding of Moses show the rays (an idea with support from the Midrash).

A rather late horned Moses, from the 1890s, is the bronze statue by Charles Henry Niehaus in the hall of the Library of Congress, Thomas Jefferson Building, in Washington D.C.

== See also ==
- Celt (tool)—Another copyist error from the Vulgate
- Marian interpretation of Genesis 3:15—comes from a reading unique to the Vulgate
- Moses (Michelangelo)
- Hereford Mappa Mundi
- Translation of religious texts
- Horns of Alexander

== Secondary sources ==
- Bertman, Stephen (2009). "The Antisemitic Origin of Michelangelo's Horned Moses". Shofar. 27 (4). Purdue University Press: 95–106. doi:10.1353/sho.0.0393. JSTOR 42944790.
- Blech, Benjamin; Doliner, Roy (2008). The Sistine Secrets. Harper Collins. ISBN 9780061469053.
- Broderick, Herbert (2017). Moses the Egyptian in the Illustrated Old English Hexateuch (British Library Cotton MS Claudius B.iv). London: University of Notre Dame. ISBN 9780268102050.
- Browne, Sir Thomas (1672) [1646]. "Chap. IX. Of the Picture of Moses with Horns". Pseudodoxia Epidemica. Vol. ix (6th ed.). pp. 286–288.
- Cox-Rearick, Janet (2023). Bronzino's Chapel of Eleonora in the Palazzo Vecchio. University of California Press. ISBN 9780520375994.
- Hoenig, Leonard J. (2011). "Shedding Light on Michelangelo's Moses". Archives of Dermatology. 147 (9): 1092. doi:10.1001/archdermatol.2011.225.
- Holloway, Simon (2009). "Horny Jew: What's the deal with Michelangelo's Moses?". galusaustralis.com. Archived from the original on 2010-01-29.
- Jones, Jonathan (June 7, 2002). "Moses, Michelangelo (1513–16)". The Guardian.
- Koosed, J. L. (2014). "Moses: The Face of Fear". Biblical Interpretation. 22 (4–5). Brill: 414–429. doi:10.1163/15685152-02245p03.
- Lebens, Samuel (2020). "Ki Tissa: Horns of Light". samlebens.com.
- MacCulloch, Diarmaid (2004). Reformation: Europe's House Divided 1490–1700. London: Viking.
- Medjuck, Bena Elisha (1998). Exodus 34:29–35: Moses' "Horns" in Early Bible Translations and Interpretations (PDF) (Master of Arts thesis). Department of Jewish Studies, McGill University.
- Mellinkoff, Ruth (1970). The Horned Moses in Medieval Art and Thought. California Studies in the History of Art. Vol. 14. University of California Press. ISBN 0520017056.
- Olszewski, Edward J (2023). The Agency of Female Typology in Italian Renaissance Paintings. Cambridge Scholars Publishing. ISBN 9781527512849.
- Strawn, Brent A. (2021). "Moses' Shining or Horned Face?". The Torah.com.
- Strickland, Debra Higgs (2003). Saracens, Demons, & Jews: Making Monsters in Medieval Art. Princeton: Princeton University Press. ISBN 0691057192.
- Strickland, Debra Higgs (2018). "Edward I, Exodus, and England on the Hereford World Map" (PDF). Speculum. 93 (2): 420–69. doi:10.1086/696540.

== Primary sources ==
- Augustinus, Aurelius (1841) [300-400 AD]. Contra Judaeos paganos et Arianos (in Latin) – via Wikisource.
- Bellarminus, Robertus Franciscus Romulus, ed. (1598) [1592]. Vulgata Clementina (in Latin) – via Wikisource.
- English translation of the Greek Septuagint Bible.
- Douay–Rheims Bible
- "Εξοδος 34:29". Greek Bible.
- "Exodus 34:29". Hebrew–English Bible (According to the Masoretic Text and the JPS 1917 ed.). 1917.
- Wordsworth, John; White, Henry Julian, eds. (1889). Nouum Testamentum Domini nostri Jesu Christi latine, secundum editionem Sancti Hieronymi. Vol. 1. Oxford: The Clarendon Press.
- The Bible, Douay-Rheims, Complete at Project Gutenberg
- "Exodus chapter 34". Tyndale Bible. Translated by William Tyndale. Bible Study Tools. 1522–1535.
