= Mosesbrunnen =

Fountain in Bern, Switzerland

Coordinates: 46.947365°N 7.450525°E

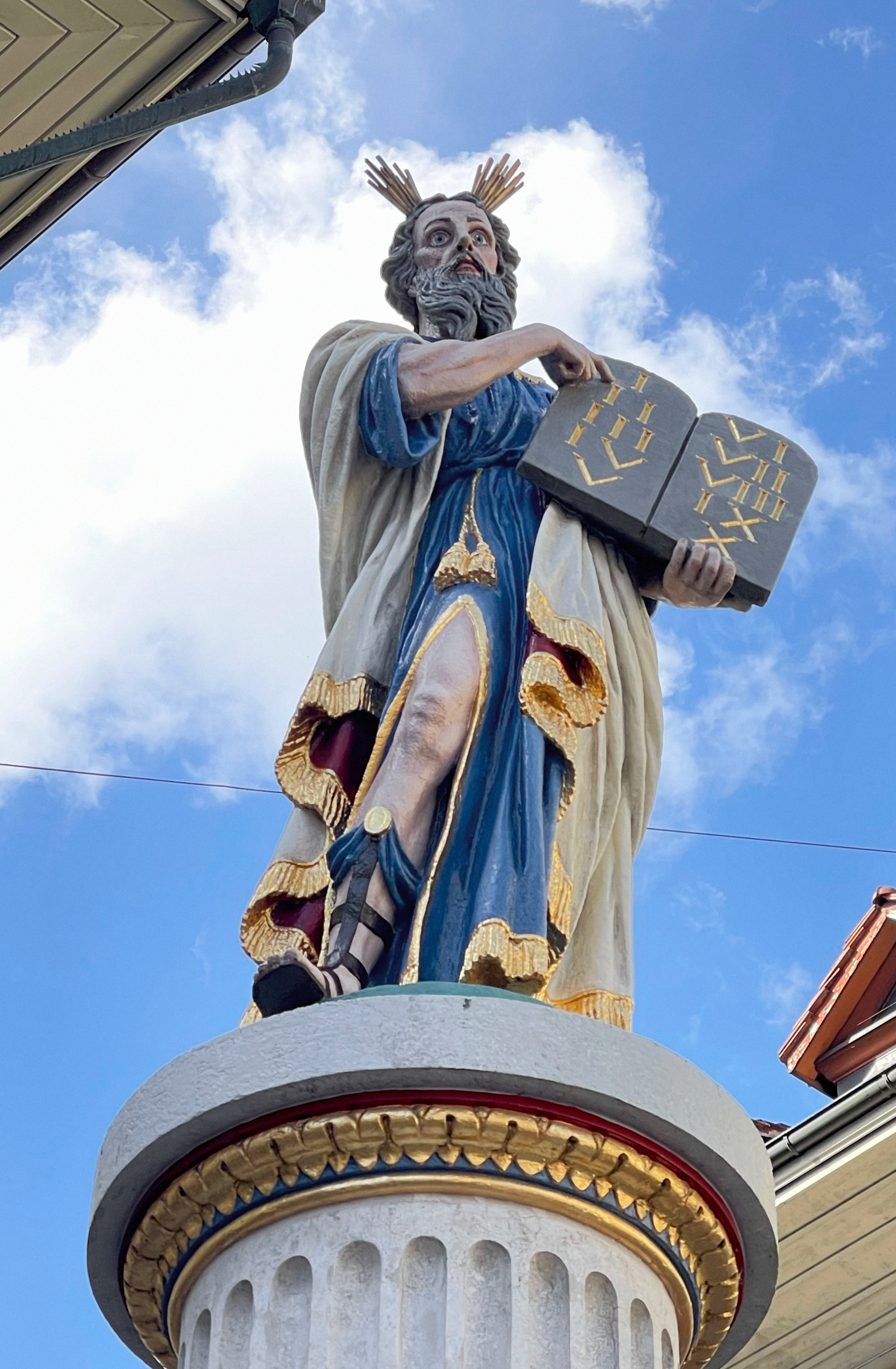
Moses with the Ten Commandments, 1544.

The Mosesbrunnen (Moses Fountain) is a fountain on Münsterplatz in the Old City of Bern, Switzerland. It is a Swiss Cultural Property of National Significance and is part of the UNESCO World Heritage Site of the Old City of Bern.

== History ==
The statue dates from 1544. After storm damage it was rebuilt in 1790-1791. The Louis XVI style basin was designed by Niklaus Sprüngli. The statue represents Moses bringing the Ten Commandments to the Tribes of Israel. Moses is portrayed with two groups of rays of light projecting from his head, which represent Exodus 34:29–35 which tells that after meeting with God the skin of Moses' face became radiant. The twin rays of light come from a longstanding tradition that Moses instead grew horns.

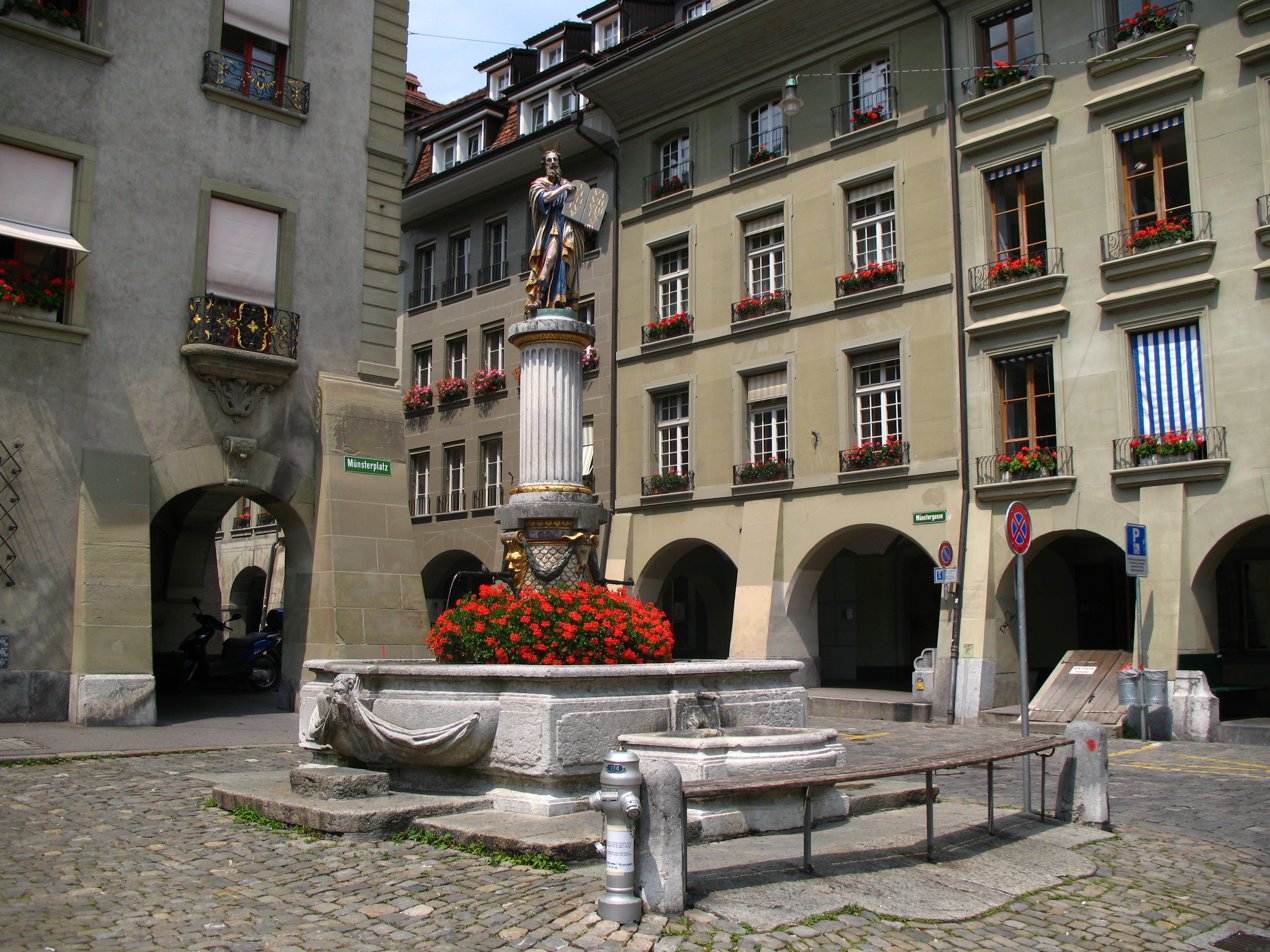
General view of the fountain

Most commentators have simply said that Jerome mistranslated קָרַ֔ן (qāran) as “horned” rather than “radiant.” But Bena Elisha Medjuck, a McGill University Department of Jewish Studies graduate student, offered a more complex explanation in his 1988 thesis “Exodus 34:29-35: Moses’ ‘Horns’ in Early Bible Translation and Interpretation.”[1] Medjuck explains that Jerome was well-acquainted both with the variant meanings of qāran and with the prevailing translation of his contemporary Jewish scholars – with whom he consulted. Jerome chose the “horned” translation as metaphor faithful to the text: a depiction of Moses’ strength and authority, and a glorification of the Lord. Jerome even explained this in his accompanying commentary.

Horns were almost universally viewed by ancient civilizations as symbols of power, not as the negative or demonic symbols they became for Christians thousands of years later. For example, both Alexander the Great and Attila the Hun were described as wearing horns. Mellinkoff reminds us that horned helmets were often worn by priests and kings, with the horns connoting that divine power and authority had been bestowed upon them.

The correct interpretation of these two words is that Moses was enlightened, that "the skin of his face shone" (as with a gloriole), as the KJV has it.

The Septuagint correctly translates the Hebrew phrase as δεδόξασται ἡ ὄψις, "his face was glorified"; but Jerome translated the phrase into Latin as cornuta esset facies sua "his face was horned".

With apparent Biblical authority, and the added convenience of giving Moses a unique and easily identifiable visual attribute (something the other Old Testament prophets notably lacked), it remained standard in Western art to depict Moses with small horns until well after the mistranslation was realized in the Renaissance. In this depiction of Moses, the error has been identified but the artist has chosen to place horns of light on Moses's head to aid in identification.
