= Niccolò de' Conti =

Italian merchant, explorer, and writer (c. 1395 – 1469)

- Born: c. 1395; Venice, Republic of Venice
- Died: 1469 (aged c. 74)
- Occupations: Merchant; explorer; writer
- Known for: Travels in India, Southeast Asia
- Children: 4

Niccolò de' Conti (c. 1395 – 1469) was a Venetian merchant, explorer, and writer. Born in Chioggia, he traveled to India and Southeast Asia, and possibly to Southern China, during the early 15th century. He was one of the sources used to create the 1450 Fra Mauro map, which indicated that there was a sea route from Europe around Africa to India.

De' Conti departed from Venice around 1419 and established himself in Damascus, Syria, where he studied Arabic. Over a period of 25 years, his familiarity with the languages and cultures of the Islamic world enabled him to travel to many places on ships owned by Islamic merchants.

De' Conti's travels followed the period of Timurid relations with Europe. They also occurred around the same time and in the same places as the Chinese expeditions of Admiral Zheng He. His accounts are contemporary, and fairly consistent with those of the Chinese writers who were on Zheng He's ships, such as Ma Huan (writing in 1433) and Fei Xin (writing in about 1436).

== Travels ==
After the return of Marco Polo in 1295 and the Franciscan friar Odoricus Mattiuzzi's (1286–1331) visit in 1310, there is no record of Italian traders returning from China until the return of de' Conti by sea in 1439.

Le voyage aux Indes de Nicolò de' Conti (1414–1439)

De' Conti first crossed the desert to reach Baghdad and from there sailed down the Tigris to Basra. He then sailed through the Persian Gulf and went to Iran where he learnt Persian.

He then crossed the Arabian sea to Cambay, in Gujarat. He travelled in India to "Pacamuria", "Helly" and Vijayanagar, capital of the Deccan before 1420, perhaps during the reign of Deva Raya II. It was in India that he coined the phrase 'Italian of the East' to refer to the Telugu language, which he found had words ending with vowels, similar to Italian. He went to "Maliapur" on the east coast of India (probably modern-day Mylapore, in Chennai), where he visited the tomb of St. Thomas, who in Christian tradition is recorded to have founded a Christian community there. He apparently married an Indian woman.

Around 1421, de' Conti crossed to "Pedir" in northern Sumatra, where he spent a year, gaining local knowledge, particularly on the gold and spice trade. (This was the period of fairly intensive contact between Sumatra and China, thanks in particular to the voyages of Zheng He.) He then continued after sailing 16 days to Tenasserim on the Malay Peninsula. He then sailed to the mouth of the Ganges, visited Sonargaon and Chittagong (in modern Bangladesh) and then went overland to Arakan (now Rakhine State, Burma). After traveling through Burma, he left for Java where he spent nine months, before going to Champa (in modern Vietnam).

De' Conti described South-East Asia as "exceeding all other regions in wealth, culture and magnificence, and abreast of Italy in civilization".

In the 1430s he sailed back to India (Quilon, Kochi, Calicut, Cambay) and then to the Middle-East (Socotra, Aden, Berbera in Somalia, Jidda in the Hejaz), from where he travelled overland via Mount Sinai, where the Spanish traveller Pedro Tafur encountered him in 1436 and reported some of Niccolò's marvels, including detailed accounts of Prester John, and thence, in company with Pedro, to Cairo.

Throughout his travels, he was accompanied by his family. However his wife, whom he had met in India, and two of his four children died in Egypt during an epidemic. He continued to Italy with his remaining children. de' Conti returned to Venice in 1444, where he remained as a respected merchant.

== Account of voyages ==
Poggio Bracciolini's record of de' Conti's account, made in 1444, constitutes one of the best accounts of the East by a 15th-century traveler. It was included in the Book IV of his "De varietate fortunae" ("On the Vicissitudes of Fortune").

Accounts of Niccolò de' Conti's travels, which first circulated in manuscript form, are said to have profoundly influenced the European geographical understanding of the areas around the Indian Ocean during the middle of the 15th century. They were the first accounts to detail the Sunda Islands and Spice Islands since the accounts of Marco Polo. His accounts probably encouraged the European travels of exploration of the end of the century.

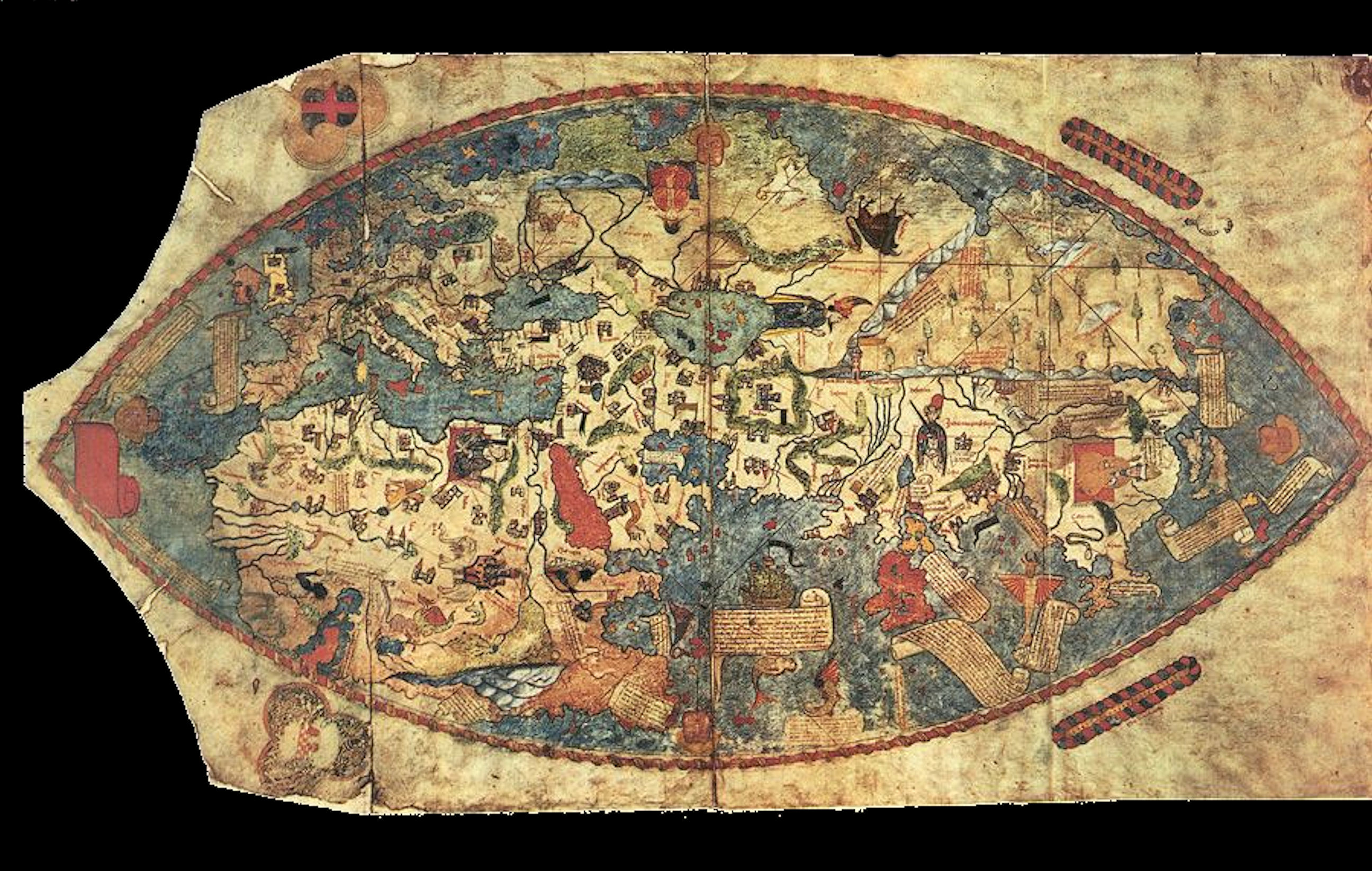
The accounts of Niccolò de' Conti influenced the maker of the 1457 Genoese map, in the form of geographic conceptions and several quotes and names taken directly from Conti.

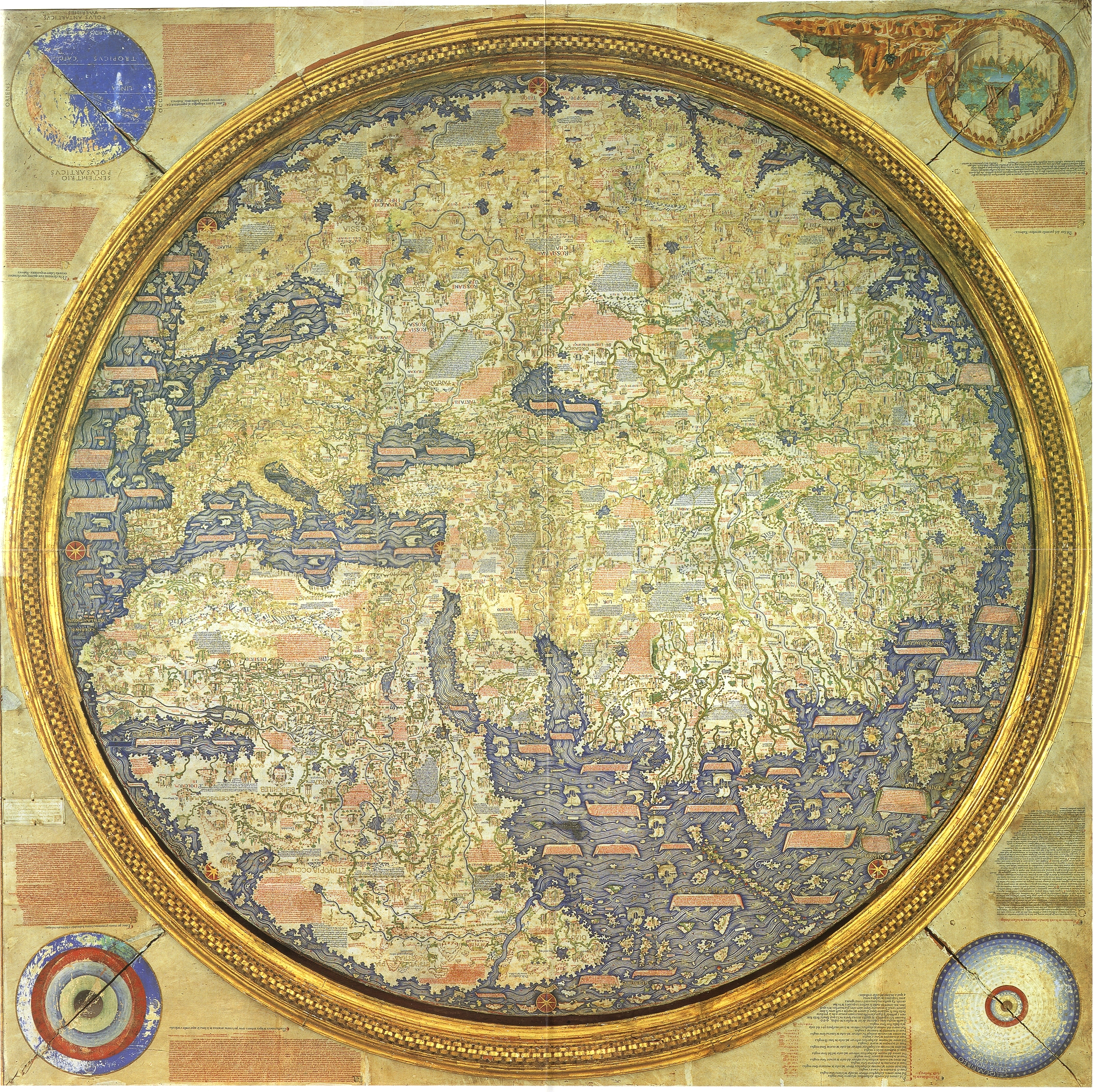
The Fra Mauro map of 1460 also relied extensively on Conti.

de' Conti also influenced 15th century cartography, as can be seen on the Genoese map (1447–1457). And there is reason to believe that some of the new information on mapmaker Fra Mauro's map was gleaned from conversation with Niccolò. The influential Fra Mauro map (1450) offered one of the clearest depictions of the Old World. In these two maps, many new location names, and several verbatim descriptions, were taken directly from de Conti's account. The "trustworthy source" whom Fra Mauro quoted in writing is thought to have been de' Conti himself. Mauro's map discusses the travels of a Zoncho de India, a "junk from India" (likely referring to China or kingdoms in the Nusantara archipelago, as both was often referred to as India during this period), beyond the Cape of Good Hope into the Atlantic Ocean around 1420, confirming that it was possible to sail around Africa through the south. In his descriptions of East Asia, de' Conti describes huge junks of about 1,000 tons (some translations have 2,000 tons*), larger than the typical 16th century Western galleons and equal to the large Manila galleons:

They build some ships much larger than ours, capable of containing 2,000 butts in size, with five sails and as many masts. The lower part is constructed of three planks, in order to withstand the force of the tempests to which they are much exposed. But some ships are built in compartments, that should one part be shattered, the other portion remains intact to accomplish the voyage.

Some translations have 2000 butts (Hakluyt Society), which is around 1,000 tons, while other translations of de' Conti have 2,000 tons (Needham). The translation above is from the Hakluyt Society's translation. A butt was unit of volume that was half a ton.

The man "from Cathay" whom Paolo Toscanelli, in a 1474 letter to Christopher Columbus, described as visiting Pope Eugenius IV (1431–1447) might have been de' Conti, who, after returning from the east, did meet Pope Eugenius in 1444:

Also in the time of Eugenius one of them [of Cathay] came to Eugenius, who affirmed their great kindness towards Christians, and I had a long conversation with him on many subjects, about the magnitude of their rivers in length and breath, and on the multitude of cities on the banks of rivers. He said that on one river there were near 200 cities with marble bridges great in length and breadth, and everywhere adorned with columns. This country is worth seeking by the Latins, not only because great wealth may be obtained from it, gold and silver, all sorts of gems, and spices, which never reach us; but also on account of its learned men, philosophers, and expert astrologers, and by what skill and art so powerful and magnificent a province is governed, as well as how their wars are conducted.

— Extract of the First Letter of Paolo Toscanelli to Columbus.

De' Conti's book was used by several explorers and travel writers, such as Ludovico di Varthema (1510), and Antonio Pigafetta, who travelled around the world with Magellan's expedition. Alfred Russel Wallace cited de' Conti's account of the peoples of Java and Sumatra in his 1869 book The Malay Archipelago.

== Editions ==
The first printed edition of de' Conti's account was made in 1492 in the original Latin by Cristoforo da Bollate and dedicated to Pietro Cara, who was going on a journey to India. Various translations followed, into Portuguese (1502) and Spanish (1503). The first Italian-language edition appears to have been translated from the Portuguese edition, and was made a part of the collection of travellers' accounts published in 1550 by Giovanni Battista Ramusio. The first English edition was translated from the Spanish, and printed in 1579 by John Frampton, using a combination of Marco Polo's and de Conti's narrations.

== See also ==
- Chronology of European exploration of Asia
- Afanasy Nikitin
