= Engineering Historical Memory =

Digital research tool for primary historical sources

Engineering Historical Memory (EHM)
- Type of site: Database and search engine for primary historical resources and secondary multi-media references
- Launched: 2007
- Founding Editor-in-Chief: Dr Andrea Nanetti
- Website: https://engineeringhistoricalmemory.com/

Engineering Historical Memory (EHM) is an online database in the digital humanities, serving as an open-access research tool for primary historical materials focused on 11th to 15th century Afro-Eurasia. It adopts computational methods to make historical documents machine-understandable. EHM parses traditional artifacts such as historical maps, travel accounts, chronicles and codices into computer-readable formats, and links them to secondary multi-media references, a process referred to as the "automatic narrative generation". This approach generates cultural narratives and facilitates interaction with the historical artifacts, making them accessible to audiences from various backgrounds.

== History ==
EHM was first theorised in 2007 by researcher Andrea Nanetti when he was a visiting scholar at Princeton University, and the preliminary test results were published between 2008 and 2011. In 2013, the EHM research team was set up in Singapore following Nanetti's professorship at Nanyang Technological University (NTU). Two years later, after receiving several Microsoft research grants, EHM went live on Microsoft Azure. In 2018, the College of Humanities, Arts and Social Sciences (CoHASS) at NTU Singapore formed the Digital Humanities Research Cluster, as part of which, EHM has been an ongoing interdisciplinary research project led by Nanetti. Partnering with international educational and cultural institutions such as Ca' Foscari University of Venice, University of Florence, Taylor & Francis Group, Delft University of Technology (TUDelft), and SenticNet, EHM has been supported by over 130 scholars and engineers.

== Applications ==
Primary historical materials on EHM are curated into several categories, including maps, travel accounts, chronicles, codices, sites, archival documents, and paintings, such as the Morosini Codex (listed under Chronicles) and Pope Gregory X's Privilege for the Holy Monastery of St Catherine of Sinai (listed under Archival Documents).

EHM has been adopted by cultural organisations as an exhibition and research tool in the digital humanities field. An example is the publication of a digital interactive edition of Fra Mauro's Map of the World on EHM, a collaboration project between NTU Singapore and the Biblioteca Nazionale Marciana of Venice. The digitisation process of the map on EHM involved transcribing and geo-referencing the textual content in the 15th-century map, followed by creating semantic annotations to connect the map's content with related secondary data sources. The e-map was subsequently adopted and launched online by Museo Galileo in March 2022 and incorporated into the virtual exhibition "Venezia and Suzhou: Water Cities along the Silk Roads" (online, September–December 2022). In 2024, the Fra Mauro's Map of the World application on EHM was awarded the Digital Humanities and Multimedia Studies Prize (DHMS) by the Medieval Academy of America.

Image-Based Video Search Engine is another experimental project under the EHM scope led by the research teams at Delft University of Technology (TUDelft) and NTU Singapore. This ongoing project aims to improve the efficiency of retrieving targeted objects from audio-visuals.

== Awards ==
In 2021, EHM won the GLAMi Awards (MuseWeb Conference - Galleries, Libraries, Archives, and Museums Innovation awards) in the "Resources for Scholars and Researchers" category. In the same year, EHM was a Falling Walls finalist for Science Breakthrough of the Year in the category Social Sciences and Humanities after nominated by the School of Advanced Study at the University of London.

In April 2022, the Italian National Commission for UNESCO has selected and sent the EHM project to the organisers of the "Jikji Memory of the World" Award for final evaluation.

In January 2024, the Medieval Academy of America announced its 2024 Digital Humanities and Multimedia Studies Prize (DHMS) goes to the Fra Mauro's Map of the World application on EHM.
