= Genoese map =

Late-Medieval map of the known world

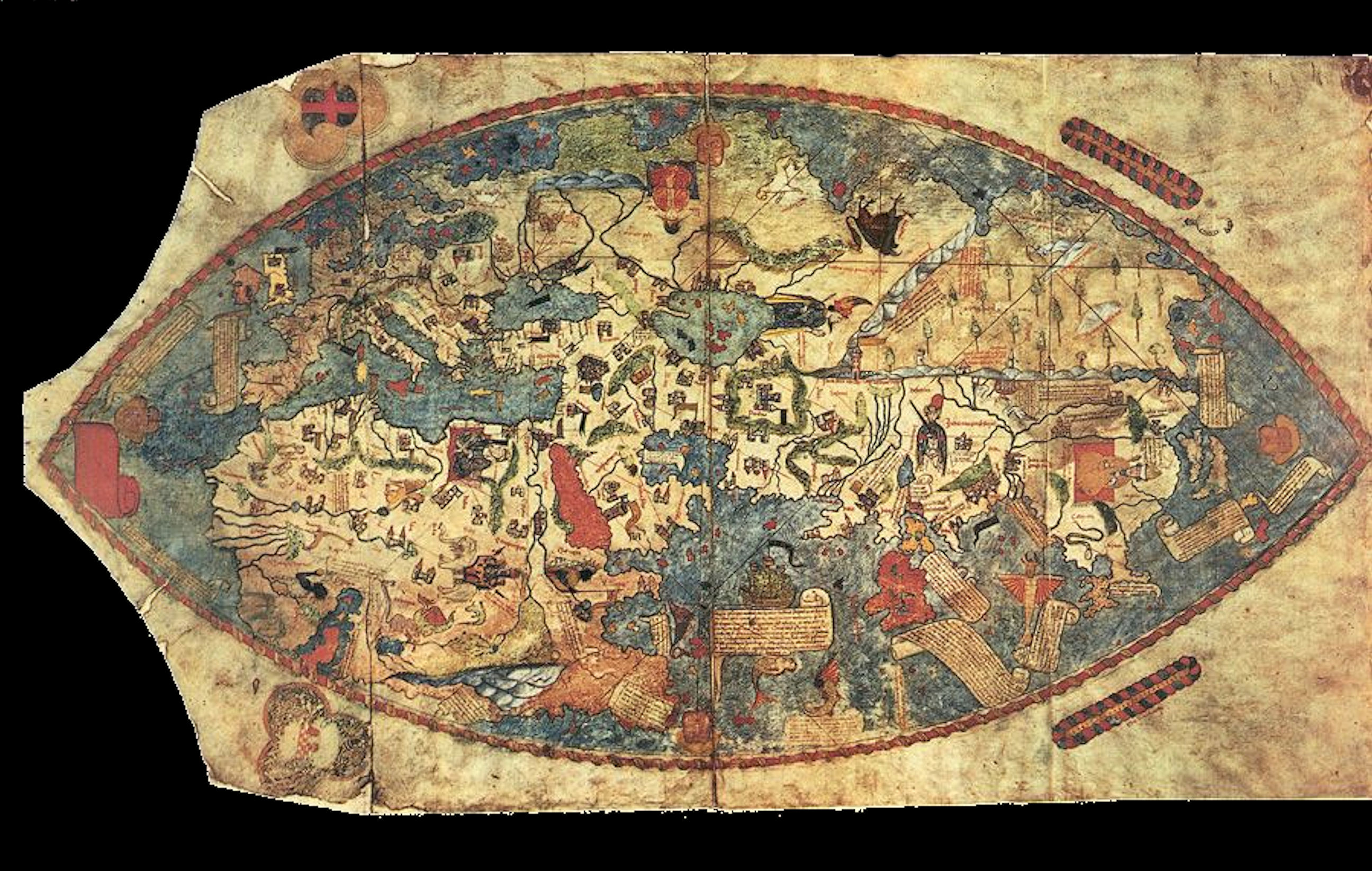
The Genoese map.

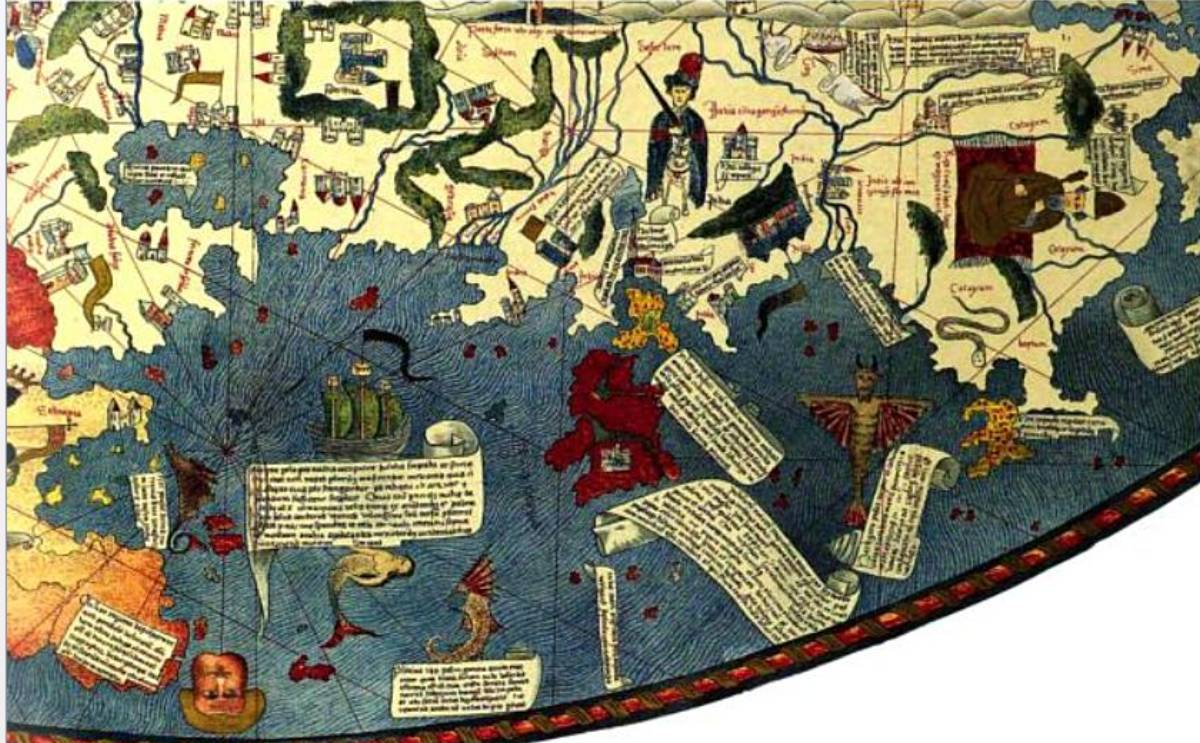
Indian Ocean portion of the Genoese map.

The Genoese map is a 1457 world map. The map relied extensively on the account of the traveler to Asia Niccolo da Conti, rather than the usual source of Marco Polo. The author is not known, but is a more modern development than the Fra Mauro world map, with fairly good proportions given to each continents. The map also depicts a three-masted European ship in the Indian Ocean, something which had not occurred yet at the time.

A Genoese flag in the upper northwest corner of the map establishes this map's origin, along with the coat of arms of the Spinolas, a prominent Genoese mercantile family. Niccolò de'Conti was from a noble mercantile family; at an early age he decided to follow in the family tradition by establishing a lucrative trading operation in the East.

The Genoese map's sea monsters reflect the cartographer's interest in exotic wonders, which is everywhere in evidence on the map, and typical of the scientific outlook of the early modern period, which was driven by curiosity and took a great interest in marvels. The demon-like monster in particular is evidence of the cartographer's research in recent travel literature to find sea monsters for his map.

This map was done in rich color and was not made particularly used for anything but for display. They say this map was sent to the Portuguese court in 1474 and then to Columbus and this is the map that he used to travel the India sea to the Atlantic but was never proven. The map is now the property of the Italian government and is to be found in the Biblioteca Nazionale Centrale of Florence.

The oval form is not unknown among medieval maps. Hugh of Saint Victor had described the world as being the shape of Noah's Ark, and Ranulf Higden world maps were oval. A standard way of describing the Earth was to compare it to an egg. The main purpose of the analogy seems to have been to describe the various spheres surrounding the Earth (egg white, shell), but the idea of an egg shape could have been derived from these works. Another possibility is that the oval form represents the mandorla, or nimbus, which surrounded Christ in many medieval works of art.

== See also ==
- Ancient world maps
