= De Virga world map =

Map made between 1411 and 1415

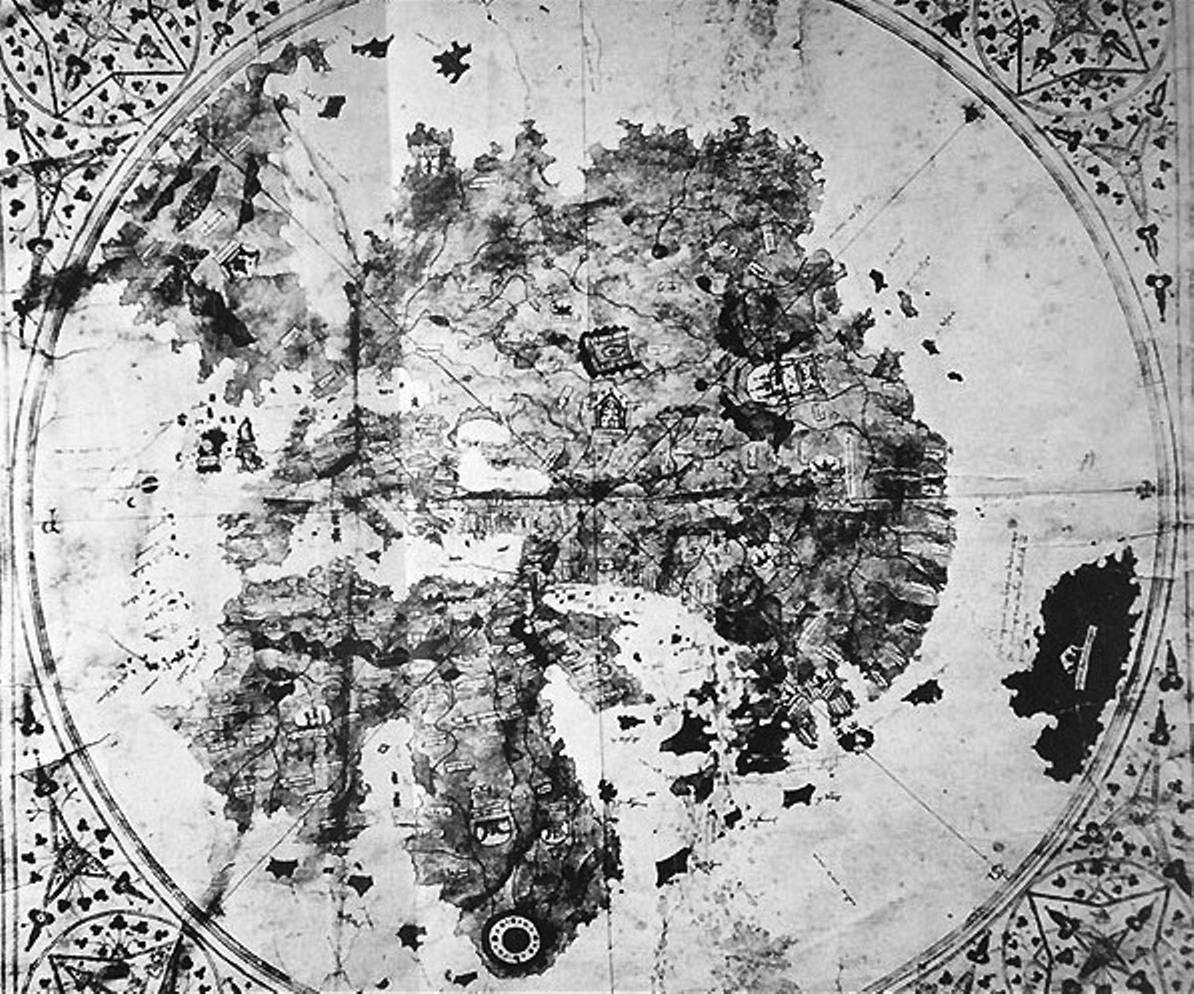
The De Virga world map (1411–1415)

The De Virga world map was made by Albertinus de Virga between 1411 and 1415. The map contains a mention in small letters:

"A. 141.. Albertin diuirga me fecit in vinexia"
"Made by Albertinius de Virga in Venice in 141.."

(the last digit of the date is erased by a fold in the map)

Albertinus de Virga, a Venetian, is also known for a 1409 map of the Mediterranean, also made in Venice.

The map disappeared, together with its owners, a Jewish family from Heidelberg, at the end of the 1930s.

== Structure ==
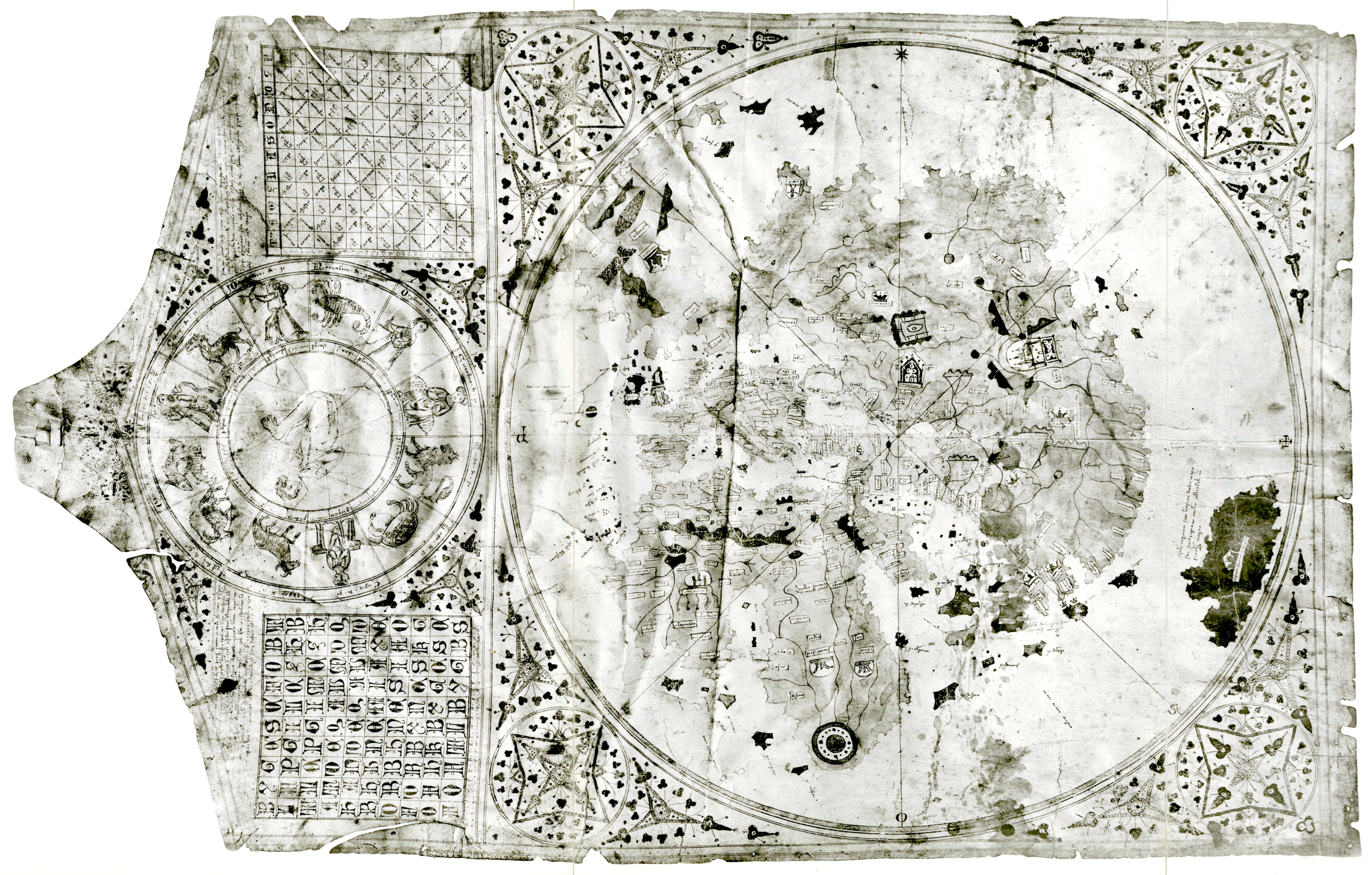
The full map, with calendar plates.

The map is circular with a diameter of 410 mm. It is drawn on a piece of parchment 696×440 mm which also includes a calendar and two tables. One table was for calculating lunar changes, the other the date of Easter.

The map is oriented to the north, with a wind rose centered in Central Asia, possibly the observatory of Ulugh Beg in the Mongol city of Samarkand in Uzbekistan, or the western shore of the Caspian Sea. The wind rose divides the map into eight sectors.

The map is colored: the seas are left white, although the Red Sea is colored in red. Continental land is colored in yellow, and several colors are used for islands. The mountains are in brown, the lakes are in blue, and rivers are in brown.

The extension shows a calendar with depictions of the signs of the zodiac and a table to calculate lunar positions.

The map is generally consistent with the Fra Mauro map (1457), also drawn before the rounding of the Cape of Good Hope, which is currently on display in Venice.

== Regions ==
The ocean surrounding the continental mass bears the mention "Mari Oziano Magno".

Jerusalem is indicated (Jordan and Gorlan), although not at the exact center of the map. The three continents are rather clearly represented, and labeled "Europa", "Africa" and "Axia". The Indian Ocean contains many colored islands, in a style reminiscent of Arab maps.

=== Atlantic Ocean ===
The Canaries and the Azores are depicted, showing an influence by Genoese and Catalan nautical maps.

=== Africa ===
Africa contains depictions of the Atlas Mountains and the Nile river, with mention of the territory of Prester John ("Pre. Joanes") in Ethiopia.

The Garden of Eden is depicted at the southernmost tip of Africa with the symbol of two concentric rings, from which emerge the four rivers mentioned in Genesis.

=== Asia ===
The locations described in Asia are consistent with Mongolian rule: Medru, Calcar, Monza sede di sedre ("the Mangi of northern China"), and Bogar Tartarorum ("the Great Bulgarian" or "Golden Horde"). On the emplacement of Karakorum, fortifications are depicted, with the mention "M[on]gol". The names shown for Chinese rivers and cities are those used by Marco Polo.

The shores of the Indian Ocean contain show the kingdoms of Mimdar and Madar (Malabar?) and probably Sri Lanka with the mention "Ysola d alegro suczimcas magna". A large island in the Indian Ocean labelled "Caparu sive Java magna" possibly combines Marco Polo's descriptions of Java and Japan.

=== Europe ===
In northern Europe, various places are mentioned, such as "Ogama, Goga" Gog and Magog, "Rotenia" Russia, Naia, Samolica, and a peninsula or promontory showing the southern end of "Norveca" Norway. Iceland/Thule is not named or shown on the map.

== History of the map ==
The map was re-discovered in a second-hand bookshop in 1911 in Šibenik, Croatia by Albert Figdor, an art collector. Albert Figdor died 1927 in Vienna. The map was analyzed by Doctor Professor Franz von Wieser, of the University of Vienna. Authenticated photographs were taken, which are today in the British Library.

In literature, there are hints that the map was retracted from the auction (piece no. 56, 14/15.June 1932) by the auction-house Gilhofer and Ranschburg (Alpenstrasse nr.6) in Lucerne. The story is not clear. The map later disappeared with its owners; a Jewish family from Heidelberg.

== See also ==
- Ancient world maps
- Fra Mauro map
- 1421 hypothesis

== Sources ==
- "Mappemondes, AD 1200–1500", Destombes
