= Piero Falchetta =

Piero Falchetta (born 1951) is an Italian cartographer, writer and translator. He is head of the department of ancient maps at the Biblioteca Marciana in Venice and a specialist of medieval travel writing, history of cartography and history of navigation. He currently lives in his native Venice. One of his most recent contributions to medieval cartography is a critical edition of Fra Mauro's World Map, published in 2006. Recent contributions to the history of navigation are the essays on Michael of Rhodes' nautical writings, and the edition of Benedetto Cotrugli's treatise De navigatione (1464–65).

He is also the author of literary essays and translations. His most notable translation is La scomparsa (1995) Italian translation on Georges Perec's lipogrammatic novel La disparition (1969) (English translation A Void, 1994), which was awarded the 1996 Leone Traverso debut prize in the Monselice Literary Prize.
