= Albertinus de Virga =

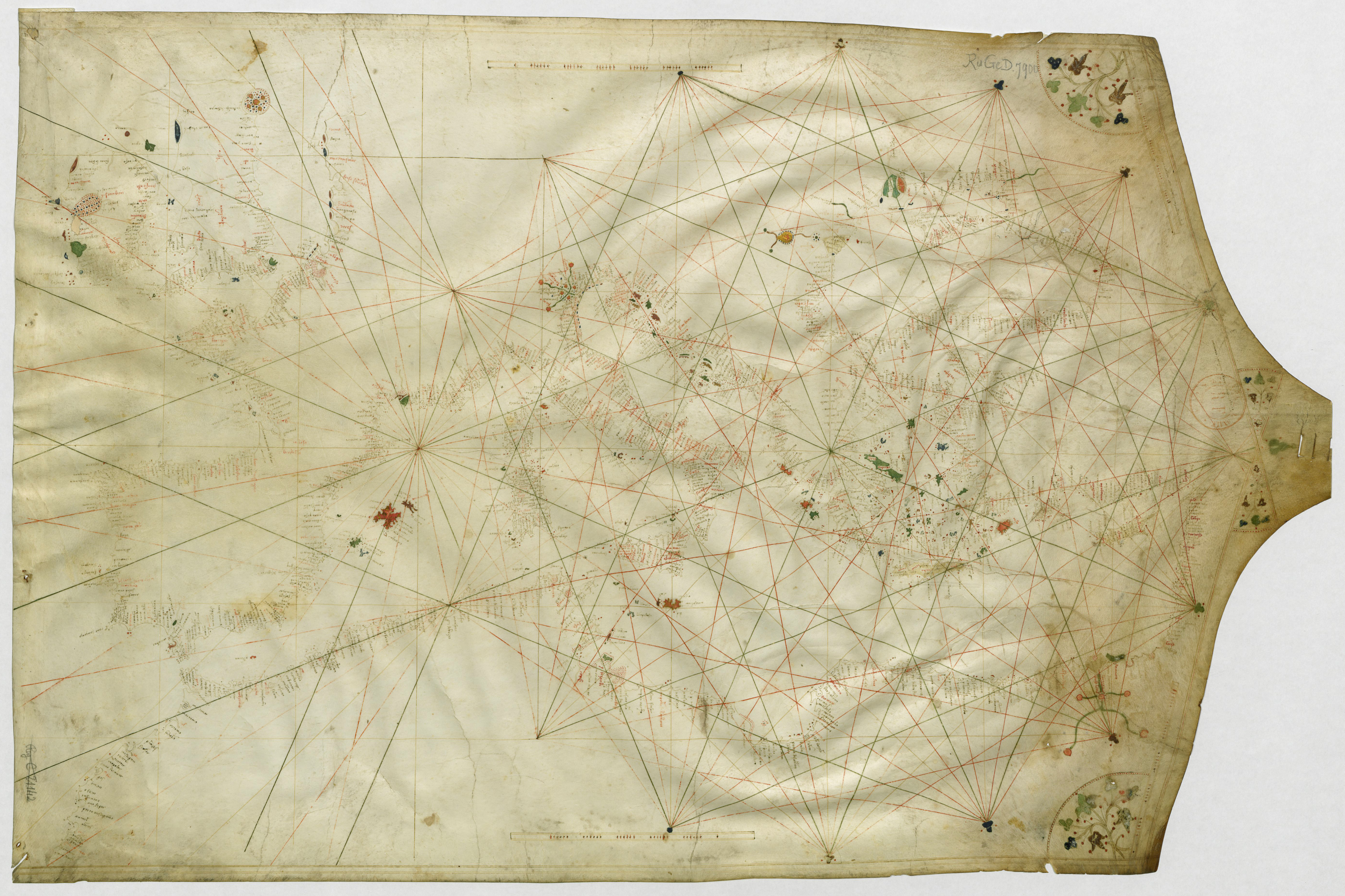
Portolan chart of Albertinus de Virga, 1409 (BNF, Paris)

Albertinus de Virga (or Albertin de Virga) was a 15th-century Venetian cartographer.

Practically nothing is known of his life, save that he was probably Venetian. Virga is the author of two famous maps:

- 1409 portolan chart, 43 x 68 cm, covering the Mediterranean, Black Sea and Atlantic coast, and signed "A 1409 Alber...Virga me fezit in Vinexia". Currently held by the Bibliothèque nationale de France in Paris, France. (D.7900)
- The De Virga world map, a mappa mundi 69.6 x 44 cm, signed "A. 141.. Albertin diuirga me fecit in vinexia", where the date has been read as between 1411 and 1415, that was once in the private collection of Albrecht Frigdor of Vienna, but has since gone missing.

It has been tentatively suggested that Virga might also have been the author of a third map, an anonymous portolan chart dating from the beginning of the 15th century currently held (Port.40) by the Museo Correr in Venice, Italy.
