= Giorgio Sideri =

Venetian cartographer

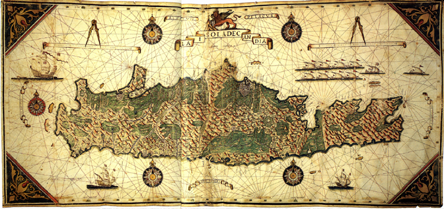
Callapoda da Candia's map of his native island (1562)

Giorgio Sideri called Callapoda (fl. 1537–1565) was a 16th-century cartographer, born in Candia (Crete), who worked in Venice, where map-making skills were essential to the mercantile economy and to protection and control of the far-flung Venetian thalassocracy.

Four of his navigational charts, and five hydrographical atlases, often in ink and watercolour on parchment are known; they bear dates ranging from 1537 to 1565, and several are dedicated to Venetian nobles.

Giorgio Sideri Callapoda came briefly into the news when his copy of a previously unknown fifteenth-century portolan chart by Fra Mauro was sold at auction in Milan, October 1984, at a price of 900 million Italian liras.

It was signed in a cartouche Giorgi Callapoda a Candia faciebat, and dated 1541; the coat-of-arms in the map shows that it was made for the Venetian commander of galleys Francesco Zeno the elder, a member of the noble Venetian family of Zeno.
