= Fra Mauro map =

1450 world map by Fra Mauro

The Fra Mauro Map of the world. The map depicts Asia, Africa and Europe, with South at the top.

The Fra Mauro map is a map of the world made around 1450 by the Italian (Venetian) cartographer Fra Mauro, which is “considered the greatest memorial of medieval cartography." It is a circular planisphere drawn on parchment and set in a wooden frame that measures over two by two meters. Including Asia, the Indian Ocean, Africa, Europe, and the Atlantic, it is oriented with south at the top. The map is usually on display in the Biblioteca Nazionale Marciana in Venice in Italy.

The Fra Mauro world map is a major cartographical work. It took several years to complete and was very expensive to produce. The map contains hundreds of detailed illustrations and more than 3000 descriptive texts. It was the most detailed and accurate representation of the world that had been produced up until that time. As such, the Fra Mauro map is considered one of the most important works in the history of cartography. According to Jerry Brotton, it marked "the beginning of the end of early medieval mappae mundi that reflected biblical geographical teaching." It placed accuracy ahead of religious or traditional beliefs, breaking with tradition, for example, by not placing Jerusalem at the center of the world and not showing a physical location for the biblical Paradise.

The maker of the map, Fra Mauro, was a Camaldolese monk from the island of Murano near Venice. He was employed as an accountant and professional cartographer. The map was made for the rulers of Venice and Portugal, two of the main seafaring nations of the time.

== The map ==
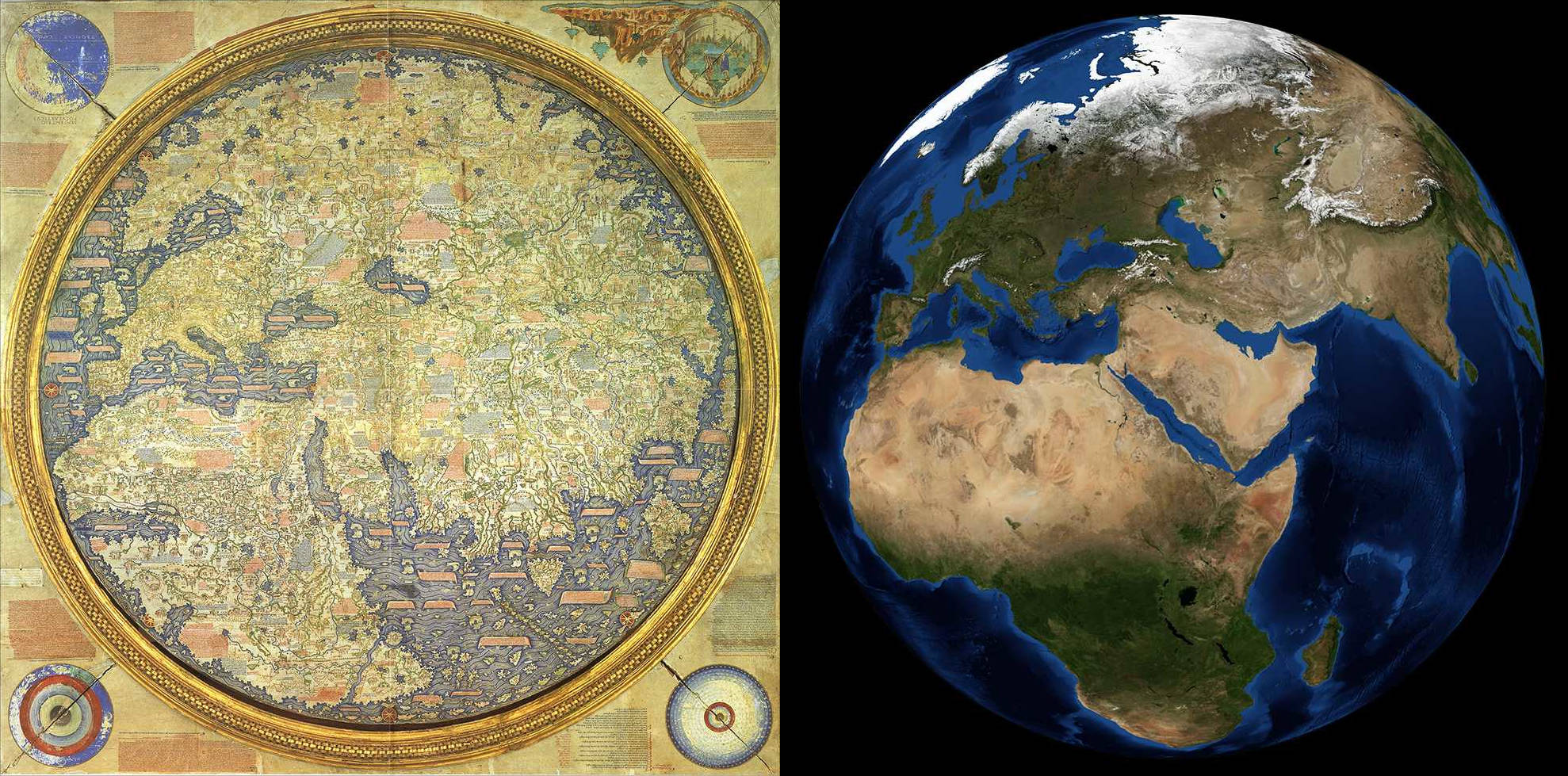
The Fra Mauro map upside-down to show North on top, compared to a modern satellite-based image of Earth by NASA

The map is very large – the full frame measures 2.4 by 2.4 metres (8 by 8 ft). This makes Fra Mauro's mappa mundi the world's largest extant map from early modern Europe. The map is drawn on high-quality vellum and is set in a gilded wooden frame. The large drawings are highly detailed and use a range of expensive colors; blue, red, turquoise, brown, green, and black are among the pigments used.

The main circular map of the world is surrounded by four smaller spheres:

- The top left sphere is a cosmological diagram – a map of the Solar System according to the Ptolemaic system.
- The top right is a diagram of the four elements – earth is followed by water, fire, and air.
- The bottom left is an illustration of the Garden of Eden. Significantly, Fra Mauro took the step of placing the Garden of Eden outside the world, rather than in its traditional place in the extreme east.
- The bottom right depicts Earth as a globe. It shows the North Pole and the South Pole, as well as the Equator and the two tropics.

About 3000 inscriptions and detailed texts describe the various geographical features on the map, as well as related information about them. The depiction of inhabited places and mountains, the map's chorography, is also an important feature. Castles and cities are identified by pictorial glyphs representing turreted castles or walled towns, distinguished in order of their importance.

The making of the map was a major undertaking and the map took several years to complete. The map was not created by Fra Mauro alone, but by a team of cartographers, artists, and copyists led by him and using some of the most expensive techniques available at the time. The price of the map would have been about an average copyist's annual salary.

=== Editions and reproductions ===
Video from the National Library of Australia explaining the significance of the map

The studio of Fra Mauro produced two original editions of the map. In addition, at least one high-quality physical reproduction is made on the same material.

- One edition was commissioned by the Signoria of Venice – the supreme body of government of the Republic of Venice. This edition is still in existence. This map was "rediscovered" in the monastery of St. Michael in Murano, where Fra Mauro had his studio. It is normally on public display in the final room of the Sale Monumenti in Venice, in the Museo Correr.
- Another edition of the map was made for King Afonso V of Portugal. This edition was produced by Fra Mauro and his assistant Andrea Bianco, a sailor-cartographer. It was completed on 24 April 1459. The map was then sent to Lisbon in Portugal. Documents show that this map was housed in the royal palace of São Jorge Castle at least until 1494, but sometime after that, the map disappeared.There is a copy or original of this map dating from 15th century in the Lisbon naval museum.

In 1804, the British cartographer William Frazer made a full reproduction of the map on vellum. Although the reproduction is exact, minor differences are seen between the Venetian original and the British copy. The Frazer reproduction is currently on display in the British Library in London. In this article, some images are from the Venetian edition and some are from the Frazer reproduction.

A number of historians of cartography, starting with Giacinto Placido Zurla (1806), have studied Fra Mauro's map. A critical edition of the map was edited by Piero Falchetta in 2006.

== Orientation and center ==
The Fra Mauro world map is unusual, but typical of Fra Mauro's portolan charts, in that its orientation is with the south at the top. One explanation for why the map places south at the top is that 15th-century compasses were south-pointing. In addition, south at the top was used in Arab maps of the time. In contrast, most European mappae mundi from the era placed east at the top, since east was the direction of the biblical Garden of Eden. Other well-known world maps of the time such as the Ptolemy map places the north at the top. Fra Mauro was aware of the religious importance of the east, as well as of the Ptolemy map, and felt the need to defend why he changed the orientation in his new world map:

I do not think it derogatory to Ptolemy if I do not follow his Cosmographia, because, to have observed his meridians or parallels or degrees, it would be necessary in respect to the setting out of the known parts of this circumference, to leave out many provinces not mentioned by Ptolemy. But principally in latitude, that is from south to north, he has much terra incognita, because in his time it was unknown.

— Text from Fra Mauro map

In another break from tradition, Jerusalem is not shown as the center of world. Fra Mauro justifies the change in this way:

Jerusalem is indeed the center of the inhabited world latitudinally, though longitudinally it is somewhat to the west, but since the western portion is more thickly populated by reason of Europe, therefore Jerusalem is also the center longitudinally if we regard not empty space but the density of population.

— Text from Fra Mauro map

== Europe ==
The European part of the map, closest to Fra Mauro's home in Venice, is the most accurate. The map depicts the Mediterranean, the Atlantic coast, the Black Sea and the Baltic Sea and extends as far as Iceland. The coasts of the Mediterranean are very accurate and every major island and land mass is depicted. Many cities and rivers, and mountain ranges of Europe are included.

=== Great Britain ===
Two legends on the map describe England and Scotland. They talk about giants, the Saxons, Saints Gregory and Augustine:

Note that in ancient times Anglia [England] was inhabited by giants, but some Trojans who had survived the slaughter of Troy came to this island, fought its inhabitants and defeated them; after their prince, Brutus, it was named Britannia. But later the Saxons and the Germans conquered it, and after one of their queens, Angela, called it Anglia. And these peoples were converted to the Faith by means of St. Gregory the pope, who sent them a bishop called Augustine.

This account is likely based on the Historia Regum Britanniae, a famous book created in the 1100s that writes about the early kings of England, famous for being one of the first texts to include King Arthur. It outlines the same story stating that Brutus, the descendant of the Trojan hero Aeneas, flees Rome to conquer Britain from its native inhabitants, the Giants.

As it is shown, Scotia [Scotland] appears contiguous to Anglia, but in its southern part it is divided from it by water and mountains. The people are of easy morals and are fierce and cruel against their enemies; and they prefer death to servitude. The island is very fertile in pastures, rivers, springs and animals and all other things; and it is like Anglia.

=== Scandinavia ===
Scandinavia is the least accurate part of the European section. A legend describing Norway and Sweden describes tall, strong and fierce people, polar bears and St. Bridget of Sweden:

Norvegia [Norway] is a very vast province surrounded by the sea and joined to Svetia [Sweden]. Here they produce no wine or oil, and the people are strong, robust and of great stature. Similarly, in Svetia the men are very fierce; and according to some, Julius Caesar was not eager to face them in battle. Similarly, these peoples were a great affliction to Europe; and at the time of Alexander, the Greeks did not have the courage to subjugate them. But now they are much diminished and do not have the reputation they formerly had. Here is said to be the body of St. Bridgit, who some say was from Svetia. And it is also said there are many new kinds of animals, especially huge white bears and other savage animals.

== Asia ==
The Asian part of the map shows the Arabian Peninsula, Persia, the Indian subcontinent including the island of Sri Lanka, and the islands of Java and Sumatra, as well as Burma, China, and the Korean Peninsula. The Caspian Sea, which is bordering Europe, has an accurate shape, but the outline of Southern Asia is distorted. India has been split in two halves. Major rivers such as the Tigris, the Indus, the Ganges, the Yellow, and the Yangtze are depicted. Cities include Baghdad, Beijing, Bokhara, and Ayutthaya.

=== Japan ===
The Fra Mauro map is one of the first Western maps to represent the islands of Japan (possibly after the De Virga world map). A part of Japan, probably Kyūshū, appears below the island of Java, with the legend "Isola de Cimpagu" (a misspelling of Cipangu).

== Africa ==
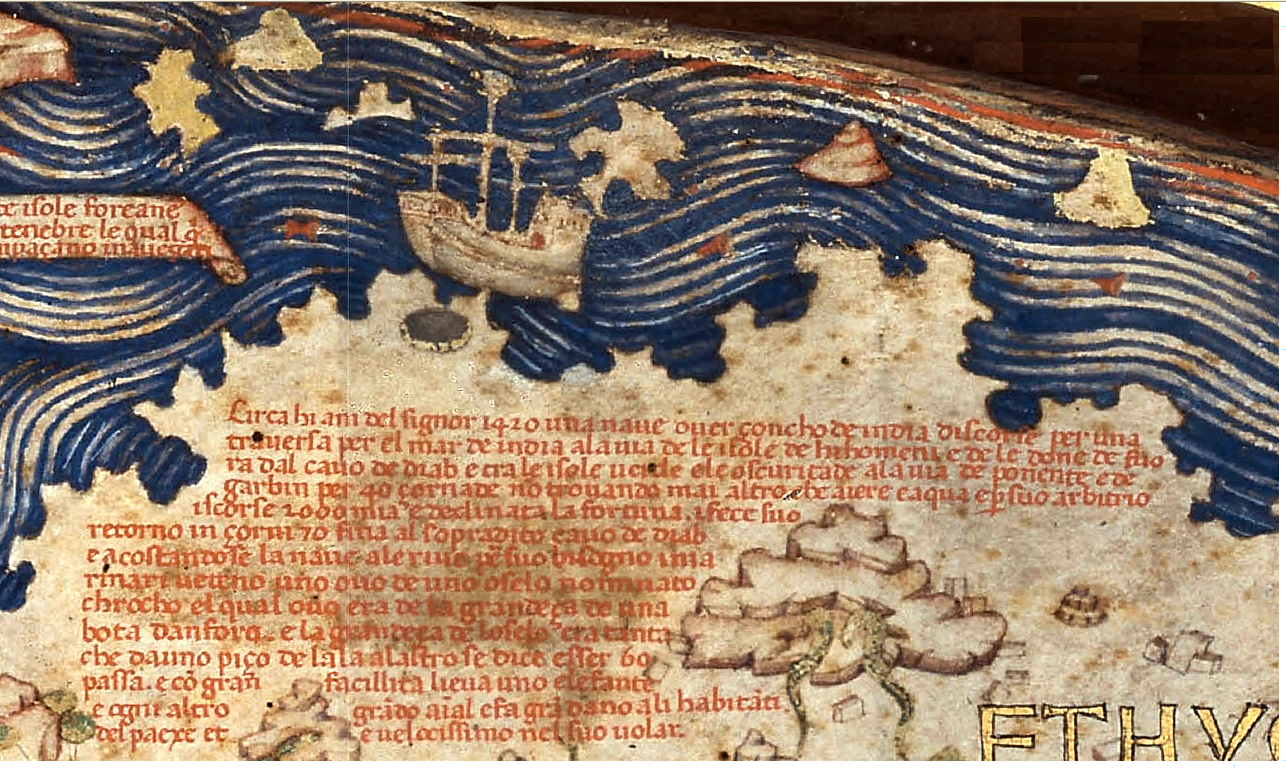
Detail of the Fra Mauro map relating the travels of a junk beyond the tip of Africa in 1420; the ship is illustrated above the text.

The description of Africa is reasonably accurate.

Some of the islands named in the area of the southern tip of Africa bear Arabian and Indian names: Nebila ("celebration" or "beautiful" in Arabic), and Mangla ("fortunate" in Sanskrit). These are normally identified as the "Islands of Men and Women" mentioned under § Indian Ocean. According to an old Arabian legend as retold by Marco Polo, one of these islands was populated exclusively by men and the other was populated exclusively by women, and the two would only meet for conjugal relations once a year. Their location was not certain and the location proposed by Fra Mauro is but one of multiple possibilities: Marco Polo himself located them in the neighborhood of Socotra, and other medieval cartographers offered locations in Southeast Asia, near Singapore or in the Philippines. The islands are generally thought to be mythical.

== Indian Ocean ==
The Indian Ocean is accurately depicted as connected to the Pacific. Several groups of smaller islands such as the Andamans and the Maldives are shown. Fra Mauro puts the following inscription by the southern tip of Africa, which he names the "Cape of Diab", describing the exploration by a ship from the east around 1420:

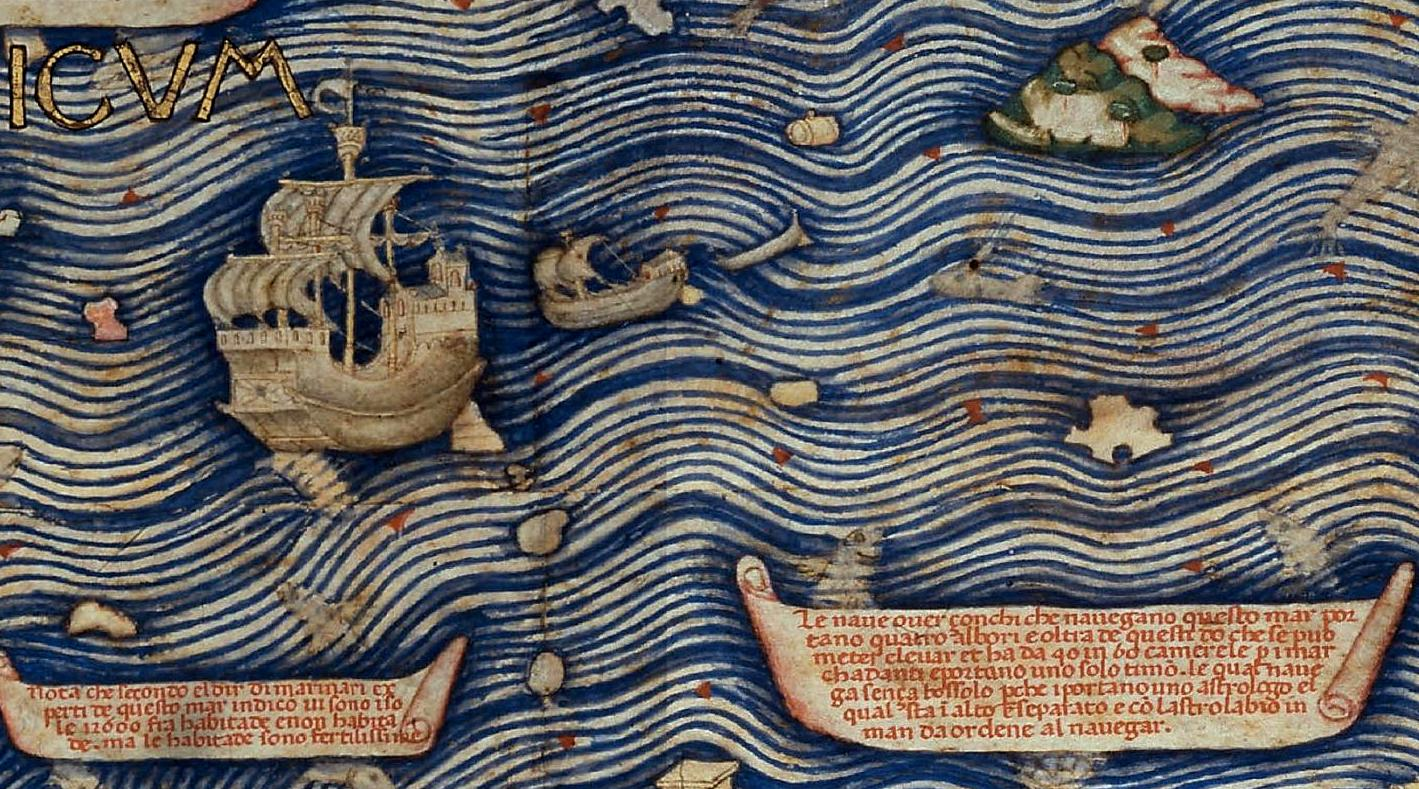
Detail of the Fra Mauro map, describing the construction of the junks that navigate in the Indian Ocean

Around 1420 a ship, or junk, from India crossed the Sea of India towards the Island of Men and the Island of Women, off Cape Diab, between the Green Islands and the shadows. It sailed for 40 days in a south-westerly direction without ever finding anything other than wind and water. According to these people themselves, the ship went some 2,000 miles ahead until – once favourable conditions came to an end – it turned round and sailed back to Cape Diab in 70 days.

The ships called junks (lit. "Zonchi") that navigate these seas carry four masts or more, some of which can be raised or lowered, and have 40 to 60 cabins for the merchants and only one tiller. They can navigate without a compass, because they have an astrologer, who stands on the side and, with an astrolabe in hand, gives orders to the navigator.

— Text from the Fra Mauro map, 09-P25.

Fra Mauro explained that he obtained the information from "a trustworthy source", who traveled with the expedition, possibly the Venetian explorer Niccolò de' Conti, who happened to be in Calicut, India, at the time the expedition left:

What is more, I have spoken with a person worthy of trust, who says that he sailed in an Indian ship caught in the fury of a tempest for 40 days out in the Sea of India, beyond the Cape of Soffala and the Green Islands towards west-southwest; and according to the astrologers who act as their guides, they had advanced almost 2,000 miles. Thus one can believe and confirm what is said by both these and those, and that they had therefore sailed 4,000 miles.

Fra Mauro also comments that the account of the expedition, together with the relation by Strabo of the travels of Eudoxus of Cyzicus from Arabia to Gibraltar through the southern ocean in antiquity, led him to believe that the Indian Ocean was not a closed sea and that Africa could be circumnavigated by her southern end (Text from Fra Mauro map, 11, G2). This knowledge, together with the map depiction of the African continent, probably encouraged the Portuguese to intensify their ultimately successful effort to round the tip of Africa.

== Americas ==
Other than Greenland, the Americas were unknown to Europeans in 1450. Greenland is included in the map as a reference to Grolanda.

== Circumference of the Earth ==
As was generally the case among medieval scholars, Fra Mauro regarded the world as a sphere. However, he used the convention of describing the continents surrounded by water within the shape of a disc. In one of the texts, the map includes an estimate of the circumference of the earth:

Likewise I have found various opinions regarding this circumference, but it is not possible to verify them. It is said to be 22,500 or 24,000 miglia or more, or less according to various considerations and opinions, but they are not of much authenticity, since they have not been tested.

Miglia is Italian for miles, a unit that was invented by the Romans but which had not yet been standardized in 1450. If miglia is taken as the Roman mile, this means the circumference would be about 34,468 km. If miglia is taken as the Italian mile, the stated circumference would be about 43,059 km. The actual meridional circumference of the Earth is close to both these values at about 40,008 km or approximately 24,860 English miles. So the stated range taken in Roman miles is 86-92% of modern measurements, whereas taken in Italian miles is 108-115% of the current measurement.

== Sources ==
The sources for the map were existing maps, charts, and manuscripts, which were combined with written and oral accounts of travelers. The text on the map mentions many of these travel accounts.

Some of the main sources were accounts of the journeys of Italian merchant and traveller Niccolò de' Conti. Setting out in 1419, De Conti traveled throughout Asia as far as China and present-day Indonesia during a period of 20 years. In the map, many new location names and several verbatim descriptions were taken directly from de Conti's account. The "trustworthy source" whom Fra Mauro quotes is thought to have been de' Conti himself. The book of travels of Marco Polo is also believed to be one of the most important sources of information, in particular about East Asia. For Africa, Fra Mauro relied on recent accounts of Portuguese exploration along the west coast. The detailed information on the southeastern coast of Africa, was likely brought by an Ethiopian embassy to Rome in the 1430s. Fra Mauro also probably relied on Arab sources. Arab influence is suggested by the north-south inversion of the map, an Arab tradition exemplified by the 12th-century maps of Muhammad al-Idrisi.

As Piero Falchetta notes, many geographical facts are reflected in Fra Mauro map for which what Fra Mauro's source was is not clear, as no similar information is found in other preserved Western maps or manuscripts of the period. This situation can be at least partially explained by the fact that, besides the existing maps and manuscripts, important sources of information for his map were oral accounts from travelers – Venetians or foreigners – coming to Venice from all parts of the then-known world. The importance of such accounts is indicated by Fra Mauro himself in a number of inscriptions. An even earlier map, the De Virga world map (1411–1415) also depicts the Old World in a way broadly similar to the Fra Mauro map, and may have contributed to it.

== Gallery ==
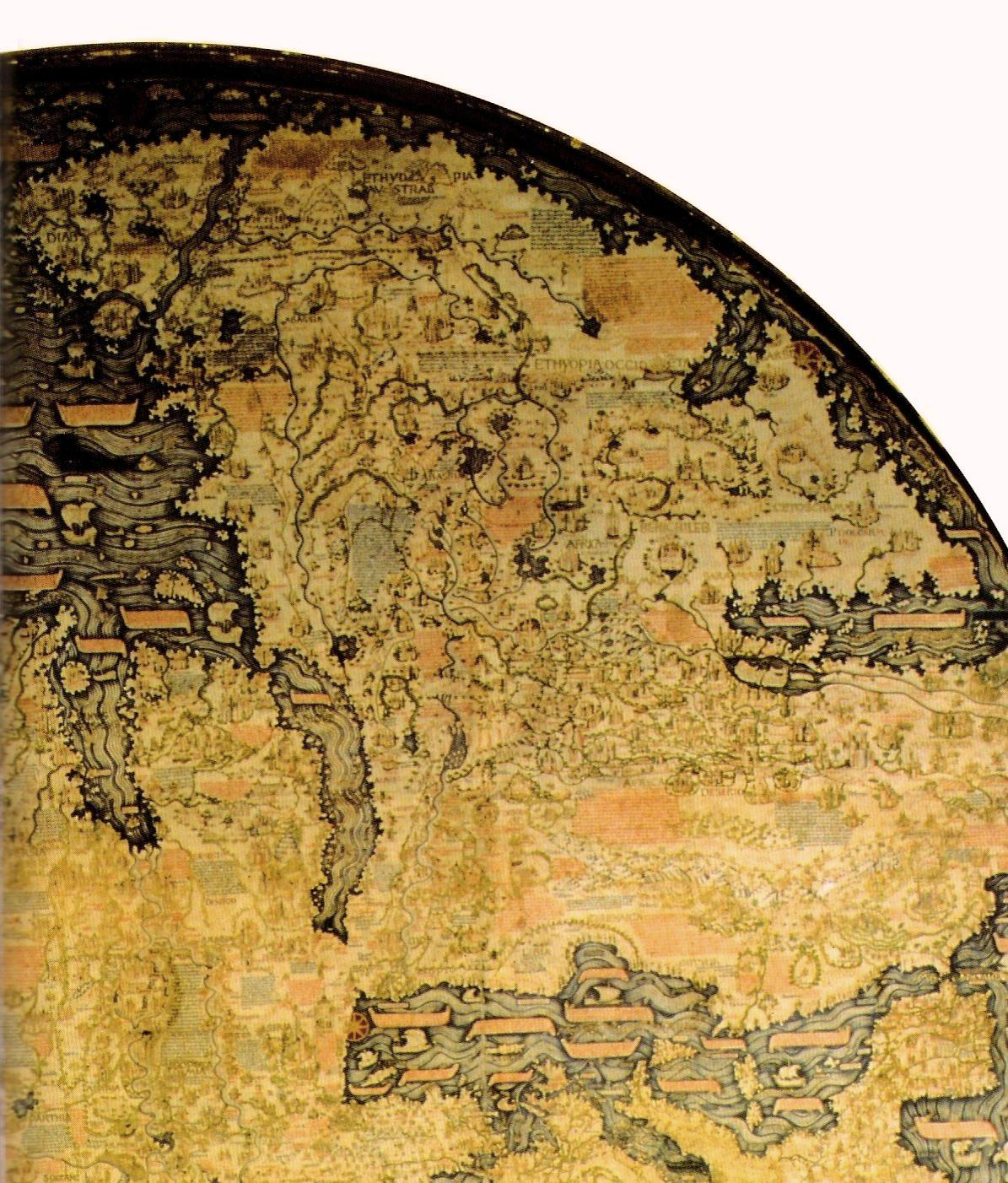
Fra Mauro's Africa (south is at the top, with the "Cape of Diab" marking the southern point)

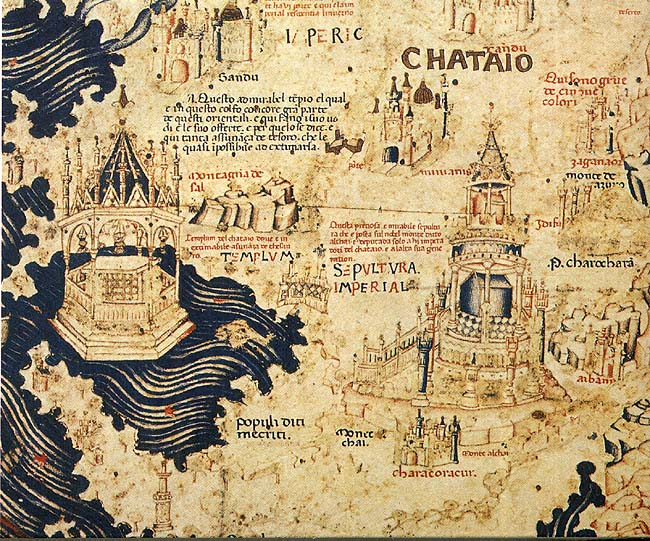
Part of China

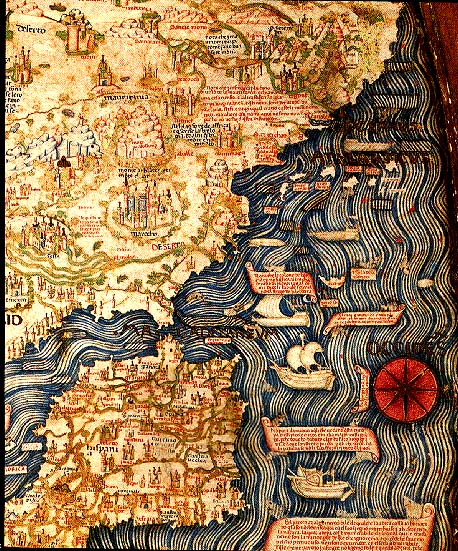
Spain, Portugal and Northern Africa

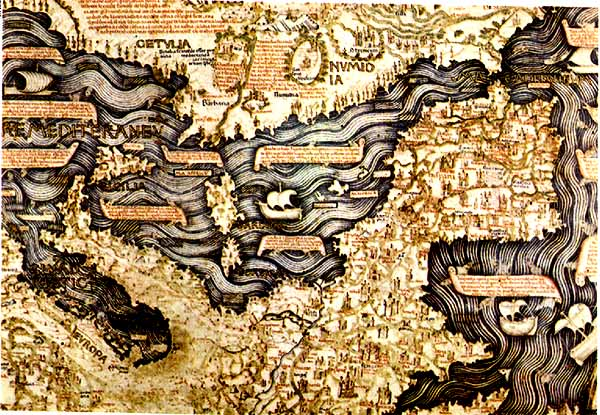
Europe

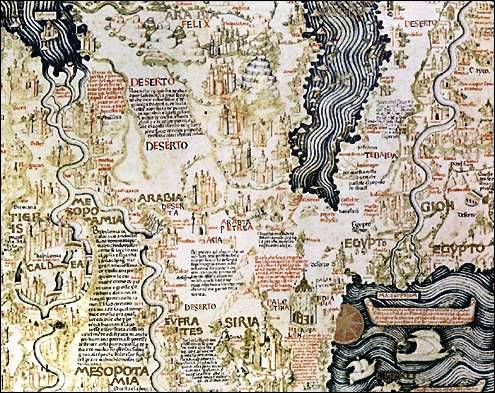
The Middle-East

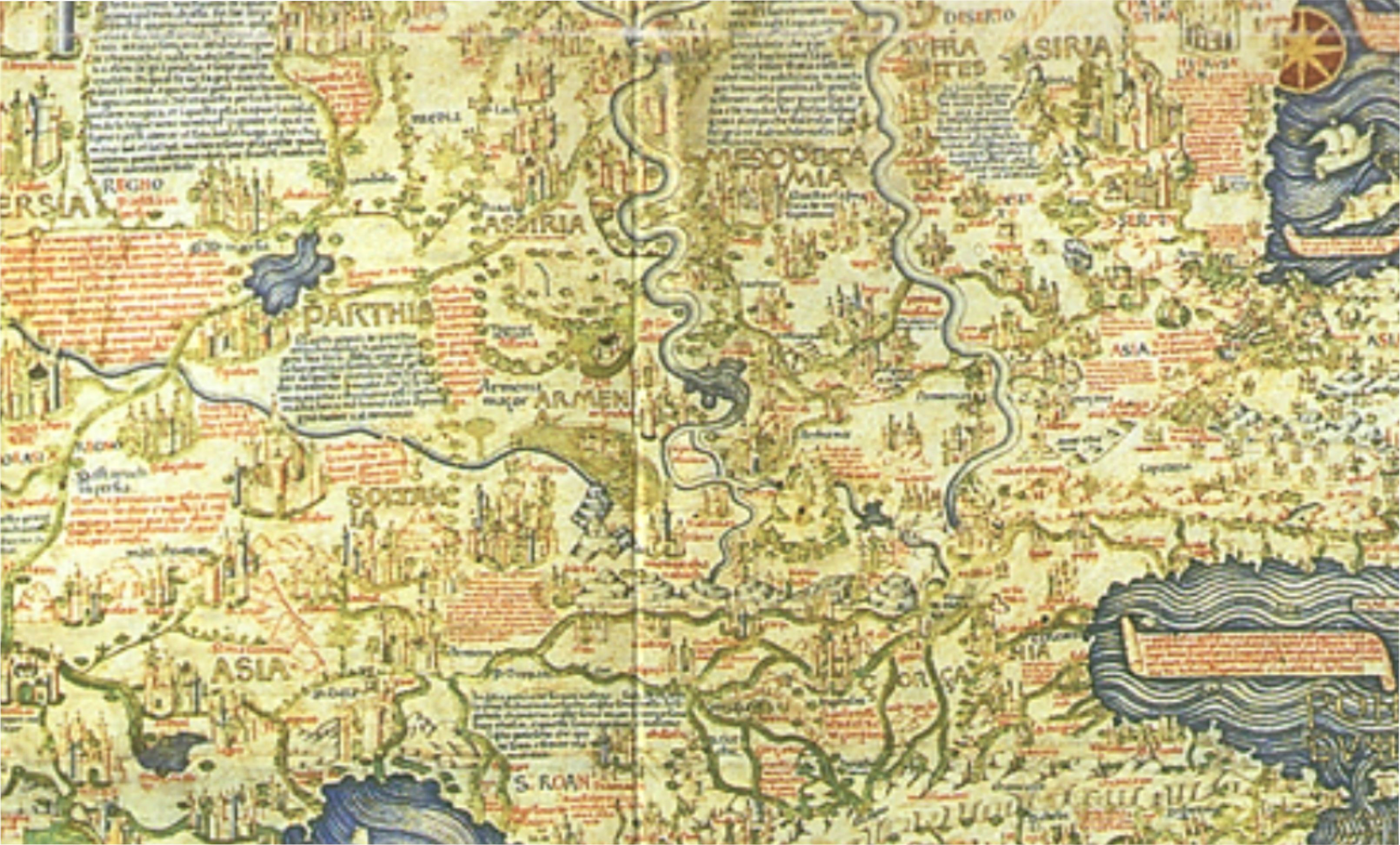
The Middle-East

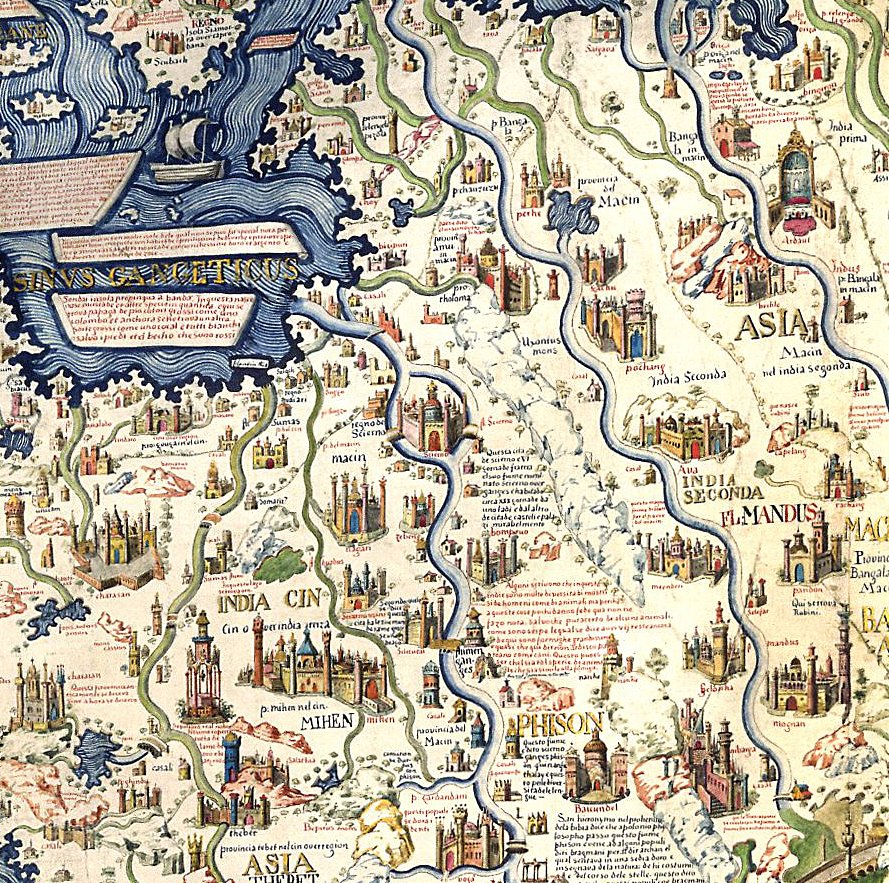
Southeast Asian mainland with the cities of "Scierno", "Pochang" and "Ava" identified as Ayutthaya in Thailand, and Bagan and Inwa in Myanmar.

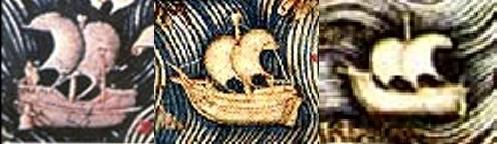
Depiction of a Chinese junk, an Atlantic ship and a Mediterranean ship in the Fra Mauro map.

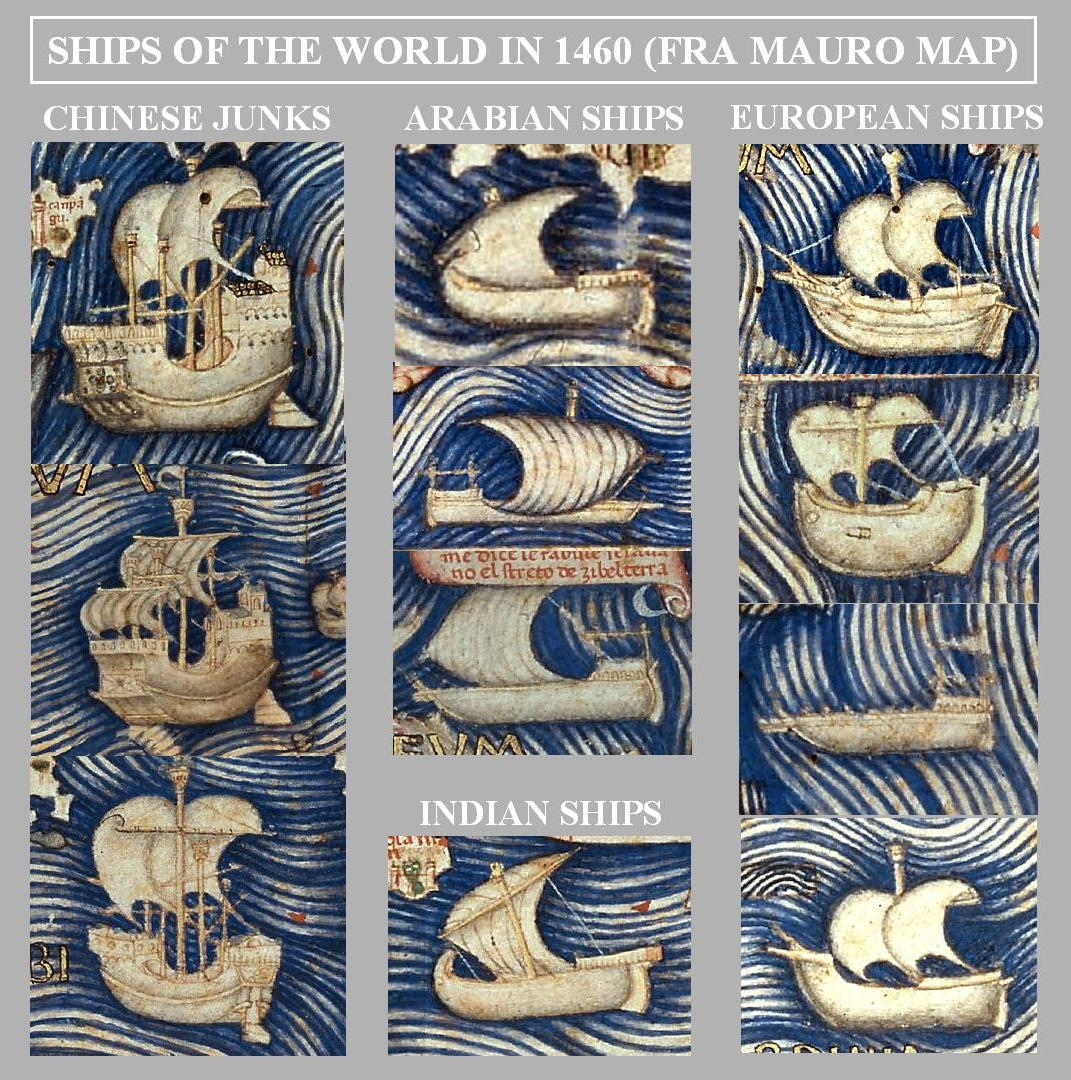
Ships of the world in 1460, according to the Fra Mauro map. Chinese junks are described as very large, three or four-masted ships

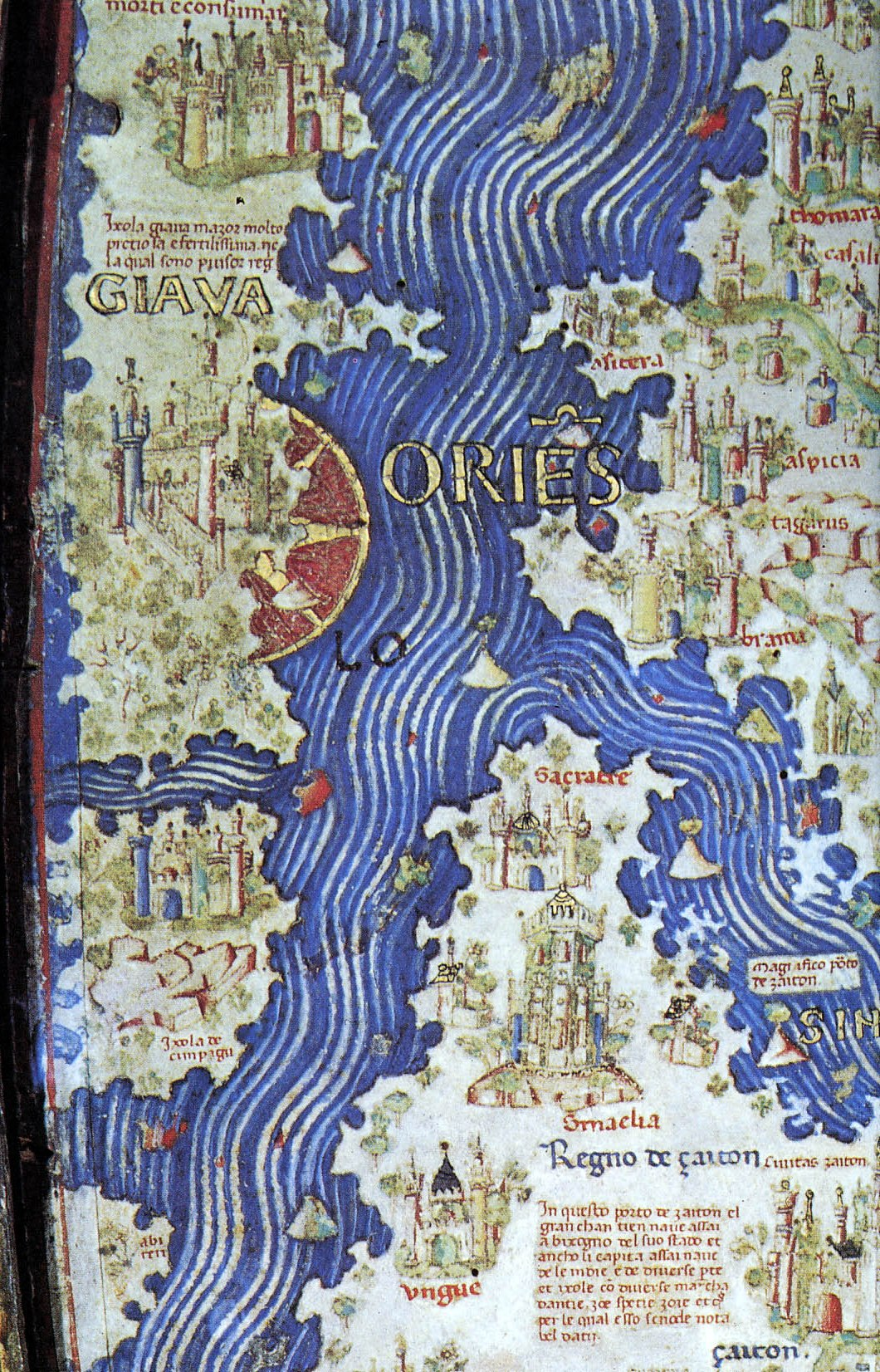
One of the first mentions of Java in a Western map

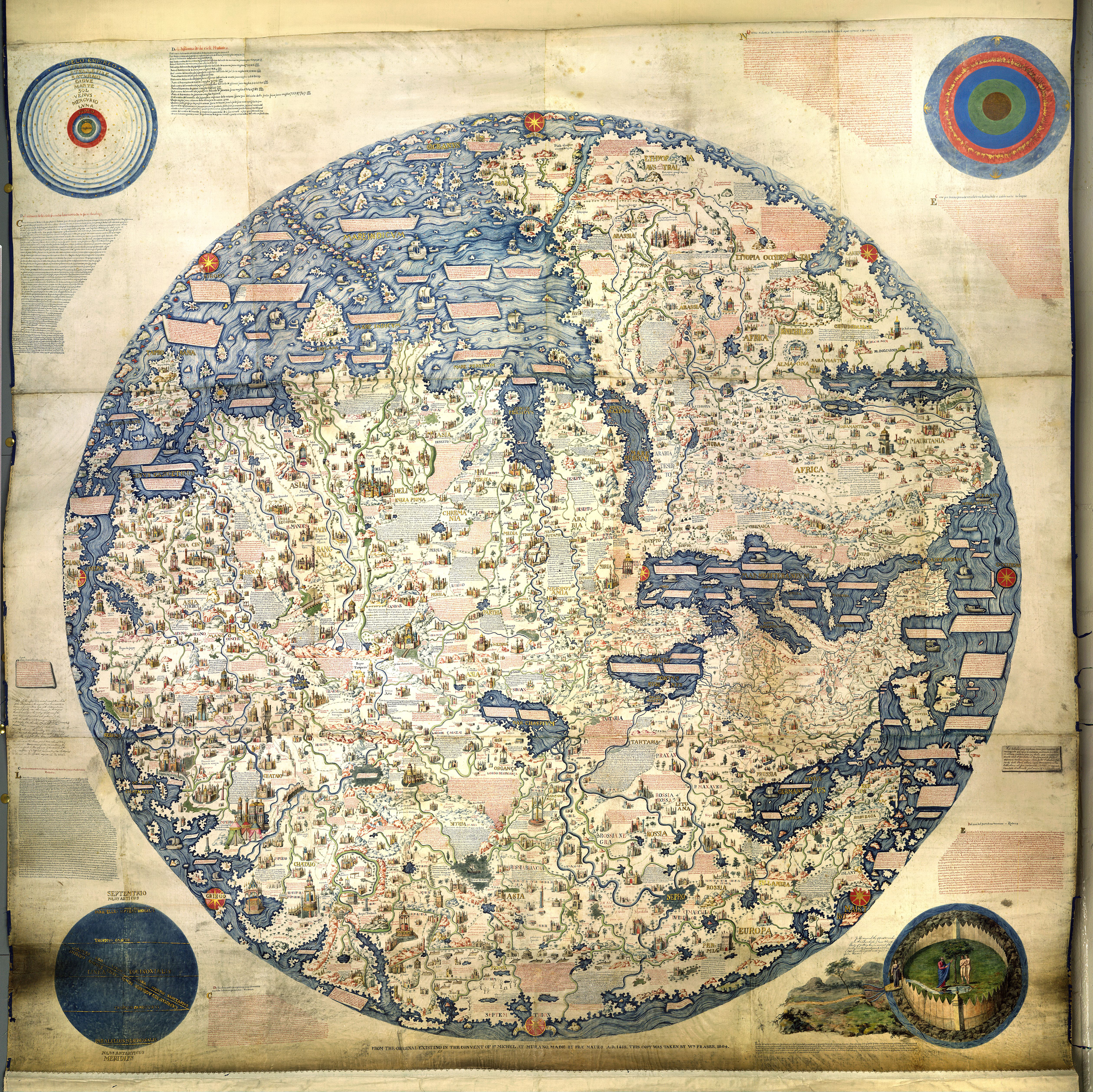
William Frazer's 1804 copy. High Resolution Full View.

== See also ==
- Ancient world maps
- Age of Discovery
- Theatrum Orbis Terrarum
