= Fra Mauro =

Venetian cartographer (c. 1400 – 1464)

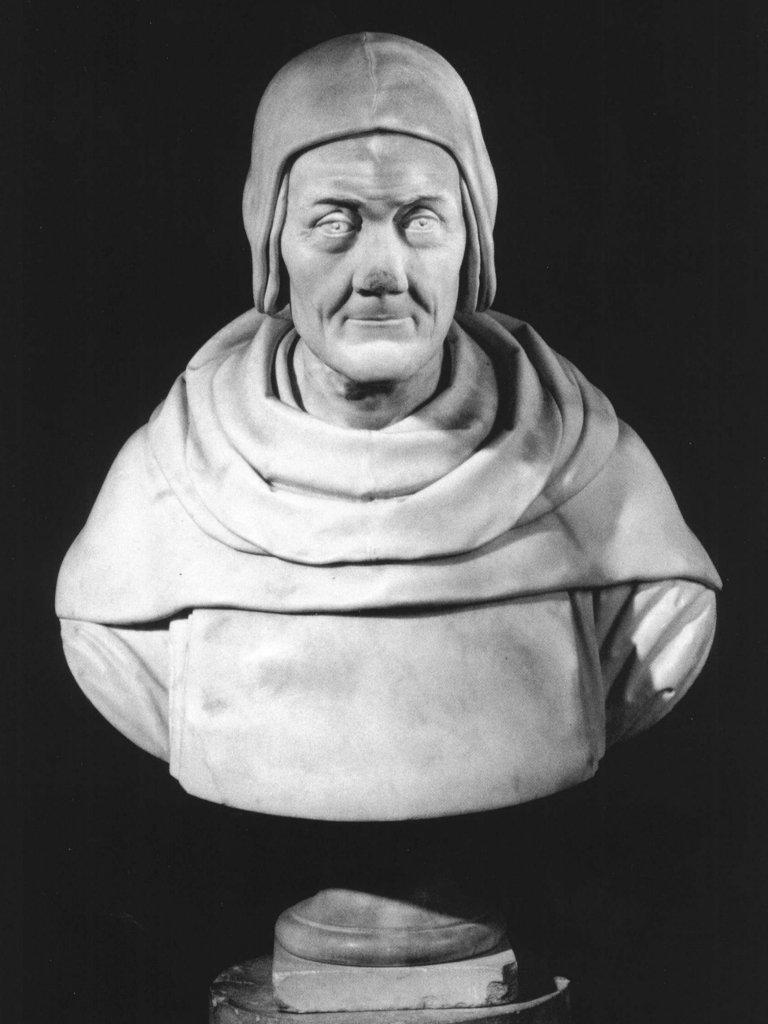
Bust of Fra Mauro

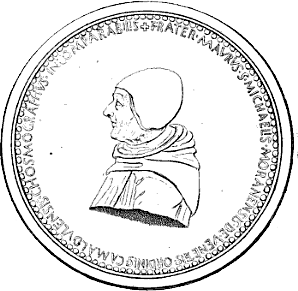
"Frater Maurus S. Michaelis Moranensis de Venetiis ordinis Camaldulensis chosmographus incomparabilis" (Fra Mauro of the Venetian monastery of St. Michael in Murano, of the Camaldolese Order, an incomparable cosmographer); a medal with the likeness of Fra Mauro, of the Camaldolese Monastery of St. Michael in Murano, Venice (c. 1459), attributed by some to Giovanni Boldù, at the City Museum of Venice

Fra Mauro OSB Cam (c. 1400 – 1464) was an Italian cartographer who lived in the Republic of Venice. He created the most detailed and accurate map of the world up until that time, the Fra Mauro map.

Mauro was a monk of the Camaldolese Monastery of St. Michael, located on the island of Murano in the Venetian Lagoon. It was there that he maintained a cartography workshop. He also was employed by some very powerful men like Prince Henry the Navigator.

== Biography ==
Fra Mauro was born before or around the year 1400. In his youth, Mauro had traveled extensively as a merchant and a soldier. He was familiar with the Middle East. He is recorded in the records of the Monastery of St. Michael from 1409. As a lay member of the monastery, Mauro was employed as mapmaker. In the records of the monastery his main job was recorded as collecting the monastery's rents, but from the 1450s he is also mentioned as the creator of a series of world maps. Although he was no longer free to travel, due to his religious status, he would frequently consult with merchants of the city upon their return from overseas voyages. By 1450 he composed a great mappa mundi – a world map – with surprising accuracy, including extensive written comments reflecting the geographic knowledge of his time. The map is known today as the "Fra Mauro map".

== Fra Mauro world map ==
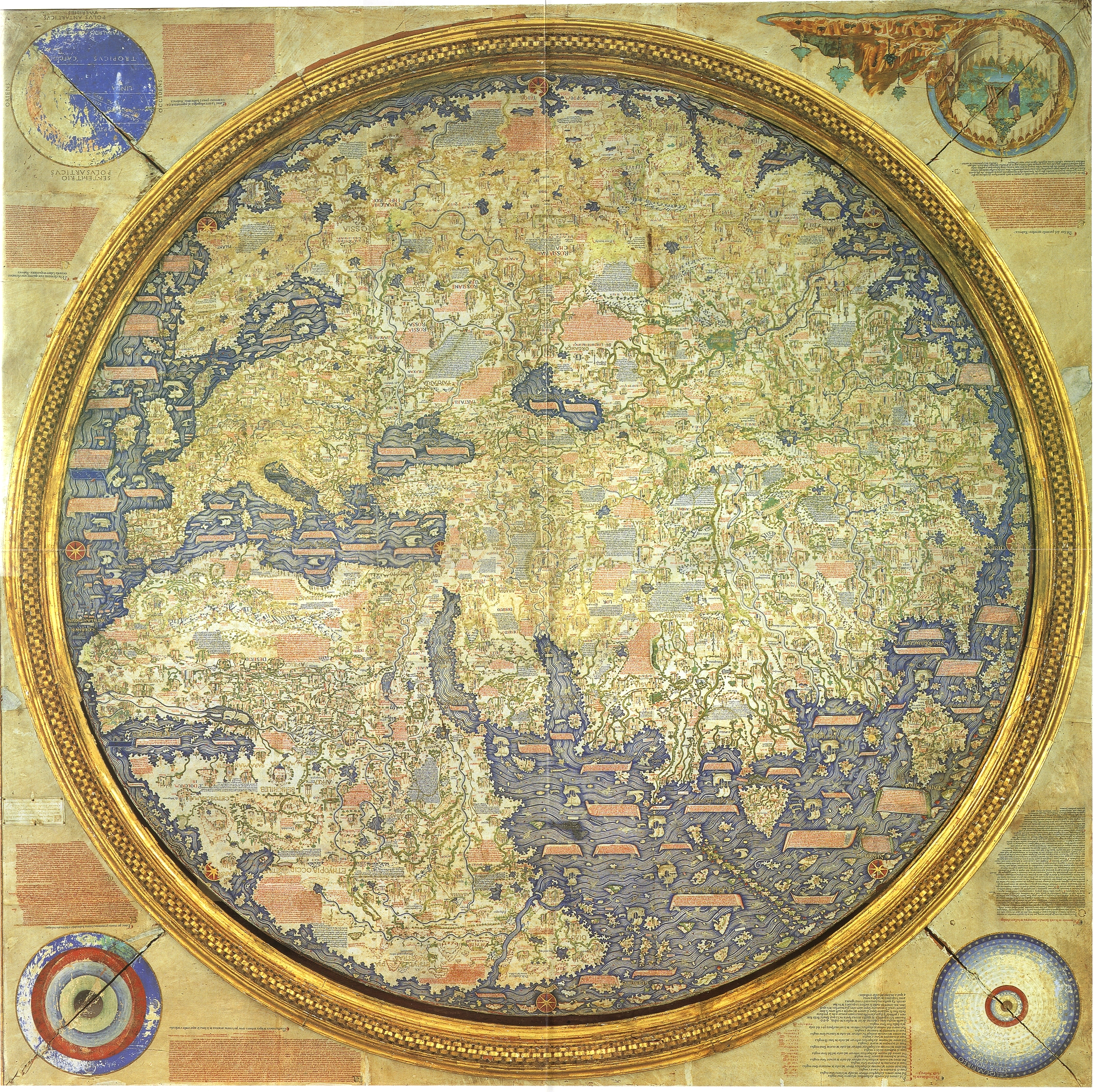
The 1450 ca. Fra Mauro map (inverted, South is normally at the top). The map is a world map that depicts Asia, Africa and Europe.

The Fra Mauro world map, or mappa mundi, was a major cartographical work that compiled much of the geographical knowledge of the time. The map covers over five square meters. The map is extremely detailed and contains many thousands of texts and illustrations. The world map took several years to complete and was the most detailed and accurate world map that had been produced up until that time.

Fra Mauro created the map under a commission by King Afonso V of Portugal. Andrea Bianco, a sailor-cartographer, is recorded as having collaborated with Fra Mauro in creating the map, as payments made to him between 1448 and 1459 testify. The map was completed on 24 April 1459, and sent to Portugal, but that copy did not survive. Along with the map was a letter from the Doge of Venice. It was intended for Prince Henry the Navigator, Afonso V's uncle. It encouraged the prince to continue funding exploratory journeys. Fra Mauro died the following year, while he was making a copy of the map for the Signoria of Venice. The copy was completed by Andrea Bianco.

== Other work ==
Two copies of maps by Fra Mauro are known to survive. One is a portolan chart in the Vatican Library, (Codice Borgiano V) published by Roberto Almagià in 1944. The other was recognized by Antonio Ratti as a copy signed by Giorgio Callapoda at Candia and dated 1541, of a lost chart by Fra Mauro, sold at auction in Milan in 1984 and now in a private collection, probably in France.

== Tributes ==
The crater Fra Mauro and associated Fra Mauro formation of the Moon are named after him. The Apollo 13 lunar mission was intended to explore the Fra Mauro formation, but due to the explosion aboard the spacecraft, Apollo 13's crew had to return to Earth without landing on the Moon. The formation was instead explored by astronauts Alan Shepard and Edgar Mitchell of the Apollo 14 mission in February 1971.

== Bibliography ==
- Cattaneo, Angelo, Il mappamondo di Fra Mauro. Venezia, 1450. San Domenico di Fiesole (Fi), European University Institute, Department of History and Civilization, 2005. Supervisor: Diogo Ramada Curto (EUI); Marica Milanesi (Università di Pavia). Examiners: Patrick Gautier Dalché (IRHT, CNRS, Paris); Anthony Molho (EUI).
- Cattaneo, Angelo, Fra Mauro's Mappa mundi and Fifteenth-Century Venice. Turnhout: Brepols Publishers (Series "Terrarum Orbis" directed by P. Gautier Dalché), 2011 [ISBN 2503523781].
- Cattaneo, Angelo, "Migrations et métamorphose des formes et savoirs dans la cartographie œcuménique. Europe – Asie, XIIIe–XVIIe siècle", in Besse, Jean-Marc et Tiberghien, Guy (eds), Opérations cartographiques. Arles, Actes Sud, 2016, pp. 234–259 [ISBN 978-2-330-06883-7].
- Cattaneo, Angelo, "Dal mappamondo di San Michele al mappamondo di Fra Mauro", in Bouloux, Nathalie; Dan, Anca; Tolias, George (eds), Orbis discipline. Liber amicorum Patrick Gautier Dalché. Turnhout: Brepols, 2016, pp. 713–728. [ISBN 978-2-503-56705-1].
- Cattaneo, Angelo; "European Medieval and Renaissance Cosmography: A Story of Multiple Voices", Asian Review of World Histories – The Official Journal of The Asian Association of World Historians, Vol. 4, Issue 1 (January 2016), pp. 35–81. [Online ISSN 2287-9811 – Print ISSN 2287-965X - doi:10.12773/arwh.2016.4.1.035
- Cattaneo, Angelo (con Nanetti, Andrea; Siew Ann Cheong; Chin-Yew Lin), "Maps as Knowledge Aggregators: from Renaissance Italy Fra Mauro to Web Search Engines", The Cartographic Journal, Vol. 52, Issue 2 (2015), pp. 159–167. [Print ISSN 0008-7041 ISSN 1743-2774]. doi:10.1080/00087041.2015.1119472
- Cattaneo, Angelo; "Scomparsa e ricomparsa di un autore: storiografia religiosa, forme della dimenticanza, percorsi della memoria", in Caby, Cécile; Licciardello, Pierluigi (eds), Camaldoli e l’Ordine camaldolese dalle origini alla fine del XV secolo. Atti del I Convegno internazionale di studi in occasione del millenario di Camaldoli (1012–2012). Monastero di Camaldoli, 31 maggio - 2 giugno 2012. Cesena: Centro storico benedettino italiano, 2014 (Serie Italia benedettina), pp. 485–522 [ISBN 978-88-98104-09-3].
- Cattaneo, Angelo; "Orb and Sceptre: Cosmography and World Cartography in Portugal and Italian Cities in the Fifteenth Century", Archives Internationales d'Histoire des Sciences 59.2 (2009). Special issue: Early Modern Cosmography, edited by Sven Dupré and Frédéric Hallyn, pp. 531–555 [ISSN 0003-9810 - OCLC 1482110 - ISBN 978-2-503-53024-6]
- Cattaneo, Angelo; "Fra Mauro camaldolese" in Valerio, Vladimiro (ed.), Cartografi veneti. Mappe, uomini e istituzioni per l'immagine e il governo del territorio. Padova: Editoriale Programma, 2007, pp. 233–237 [ISBN 8871231554].
- Cattaneo, Angelo; "Letture e lettori della Geografia di Tolomeo a Venezia intorno alla metà del Quattrocento", Geographia Antiqua 4-5 (2005), pp. 41–65 [ISSN 1121-8940].
- Cattaneo, Angelo; "Scritture di viaggio e scrittura cartografica. La mappamundi di Fra Mauro e i racconti di Marco Polo e Niccolò de' Conti", Itineraria 3-4 (2005), pp. 157–202 [ISSN 1594-1019].
- Cattaneo, Angelo; "Fra Mauro Cosmographus Incomparabilis and His Mappamundi: Documents, Sources, and Protocols for Mapping", in Curto Ramada, Diogo; Cattaneo, Angelo; Ferrand Almeida, André (eds), La cartografia europea tra primo Rinascimento e fine dell´Illuminismo. Firenze: L.S. Olschki, 2003, pp. 19–48 [ISBN 8822252403].
- Cattaneo, Angelo; "God in His World. Leonardo Bellini Illuminator of the Earthly Paradise in Fra Mauro’s Mappamundi", Imago Mundi 55 (2003), pp. 97–102 [ISSN 0308-5694 & ISSN 1479-7801].

== Sources ==
- Novel A Mapmaker's Dream. The meditations of Fra Mauro, cartographer to the Court of Venice. by James Cowan. Shambala publications USA.
