= Book of the Consulate of the Sea =

Compilation of maritime law in the Mediterranean Sea (published 1320-30)

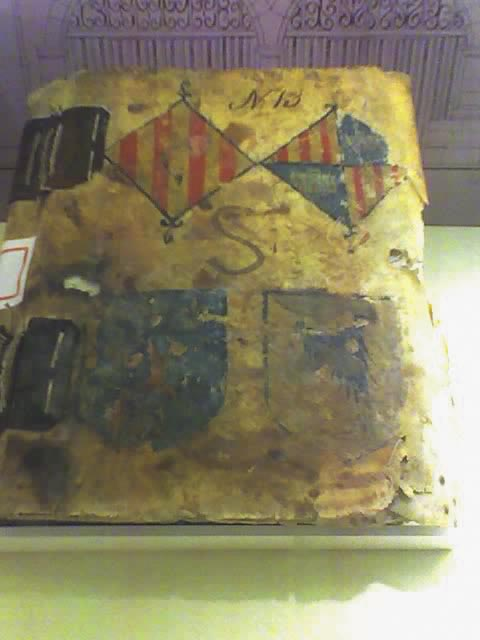
- Book of the Consulate of the Sea
- Author: Piero
- Original title: Llibre del Consolat de Mar (Valencian)
- Language: Valencian
- Genre: Compendium of laws
- Publication date: 1320–1330
- Publication place: Kingdom of Valencia
- English publication date: N/A
- Media type: Paper and parchment

The Book of the Consulate of the Sea (Catalan: Llibre del Consolat de Mar, lit. 'Book of the Consulate of Sea') is a compendium of maritime law that governed trade in the Mediterranean for centuries. Of Catalan origin, it was translated into many languages and served as the basis for current international maritime law.

When setting the first Consulate of the Sea in Valencia, king Peter III of Catalonia and Aragon decided to apply the maritime customs of Barcelona, called costums de mar, which had not yet been codified, although there did already exist in Barcelona another compilation of maritime rules, called Ordinacions de Ribera, which established norms for policing harbours and coastal waters.

The merit of the Book of the Consulate of the Sea is that it is the first work to collect the scattered laws and customs of Roman, Greek, Byzantine, Rhodian, Italian, French and Spanish maritime rights.

Until the publication of the Ordonnance de la Marine in France in 1681, the Book of the Consulate of the Sea was the code of maritime law in force throughout the Mediterranean. In Spain it continued in use until the introduction of the Spanish Commercial Code. The Book of the Consulate of the Sea effectively replaced the Amalfi Tables, a set of rules written in Amalfi to regulate maritime trade.

== Origin ==
According to Chiner and Chacon, the Ordinances of the Ribera (i.e. seaside) ( Ordinationes Ripariae ), written in 1258, did not yet encode the maritime customs of Barcelona, and that the first reference to "Sea consuls" appears in Barcelona in 1282, and one year later the Consulate of the Sea was written in Valencia. Also note that the consuls of Barcelona had no independence assigned later on in the Book of the Consulate of the Sea. Customs collected in the book would be in part coming from a Barcelona origin, but also in the other parts of the Mediterranean that were under the rule of the Counts of the catalan House of Barcelona, and which subsequently were copied to the other consulates. According to Arcadi Garcia Sanz, the main difference between the consulates of Barcelona and Valencia would be the fact that the latter had "royal jurisdiction", as the House of Barcelona used instead the term "County". Nevertheless, it was the catalan House of Barcelona whom ruled the confederation of different kingdoms like Aragon, Valencia, Mallorca Sicily and Neaple.

Customs Consulate were explicitly based on the Usus at consuetudo Maris according to the privilege of founding of the December 1 of 1283, which was a juridic set of maritime practices (Usus Maris) based on a written legal text (Consuetudo Maris) and both together would be the jurídicomarítima tradition of the western Mediterranean. is documented that the text was already in Catalonia, as it was in Vic 1231, and was incorporated in Catalan in the 'Custom of Tortosa in 1272.

In the late eighteenth century, Antonio de Capmany y Montpalau concludes, after deeply studying the subject, that the Book of the Consulate of the Sea was written in Barcelona between 1258 and 1266, accepting the influence from Pisa, and he rejecting the arguments that gave an Italian origin to the book. At the same time, the Sardinian Domenico Azun argues in favor of a Pisan origin, stating that, Pisa as a leading maritime power of the time, should necessarily have their own maritime legislation. French Pardessus, in his study Collection de lois maritimes anterieures au XVIII siècle disagrees from Azun, considering that the first copy is not the one written in Latin that he had studied, but the one written in Catalan. He assumes that it was handwritten in Barcelona, but between 1340 and 1400, disagreeing on this point with Capmany. Later, Wildscut, considering that the original compilation makes no reference to the Bills of exchange, he concludes that this Catalan document must predate the first half of the 13th century.

== Influence and impact ==
The expansion of the Catalan Navy and its commercial and maritime supremacy meant that the Book of the Consulate of the Sea was respected throughout the Mediterranean and up into the Atlantic. Based originally on the maritime customs of Barcelona and supplemented by the Valencia Consulate of the Sea, the Book of the Consulate of the Sea laid the basis for all subsequent Mediterranean maritime customs, and later the International Maritime Laws.

Originally written in Catalan, the Book of the Consulate of the Sea was translated into Italian, French, English, Castilian and other languages, and for centuries was the basis of merchant marine legislation in many countries, even up to modern times.

An annex of the book contains Barcelona's ordinances of 1435 on marine insurance. The wide circulation of the book helped spread these ordinances throughout Europe.

The Nueva Planta decrees (1707–1716) appart from prohibiting the catalan language, it entirely suppressed all catalan governing structures, including the Consulates of the Sea in Mediterranean Coast, except in Mallorca and Barcelona. The latter did not usually act in interference with the Bourbon laws. The rules of the Book of the Consulate of the Sea were active in Spain until 1829, when they were replaced by the Spanish code of commerce, inspired by French law.

Several European countries continued to use these ordinances until the eighteenth century. In 1874 Sir Travers Twiss translated them into English for reasons of utility, in the early twentieth century a court in the United States denied an action on the grounds of its not being supported by the Consulate of the Sea, and in March 1937 the Court of Appeal of Alexandria quoted a chapter of the book in its judgment.

== Editions ==
=== First mention 1231 and 1283 ===
The catalan Customs Consulate were explicitly based on the Usus at consuetudo Maris according to the privilege of founding of the December 1 of 1283, which was a juridic set of maritime practices (Usus Maris) based on a written legal text (Consuetudo Maris) and both together would be the jurídicomarítima tradition of the western Mediterranean. is documented that the text was already in Catalonia, as it was in Vic 1231, and was incorporated in Catalan in the 'Custom of Tortosa in 1272.

=== First compilation 1320–1330 ===
The first Valencian collection of customs sea was made in Valencia between 1320 and 1330.

=== Majorcan Edition 1345 ===
The city of Mallorca surrendered to Peter the Ceremonious, and in 1343 was awarded the "Consolat de Mar de Mallorques", governed by the customs of Valencia, "per modum the form in civitate Valencia usitatos". According to Arcadi Garcia Sanz, it became an adaptation and not a replica. Huguet Borras drafted the Ordre judiciària de la Cort dels cònsols del mar de la ciutat de València; (judiciary Order of the Court of consuls Sea of the city of Valencia) and rewrote the Valencian customs, creating a compilation called Capítols del Consolat de mar de Mallorques (chapters of the Sea Consulate of Mallorca), documented for the first time on 14 February 1345.

=== Valencian Consulat de Mar 1407 ===
The second known Edition after the one of Barcelona.

The original manuscript is preserved in the Municipal Archives of Valencia.

There are several medieval manuscript copies, although one of the finest examples from the artistic point of view is the codex called "Consolat del Mar" with miniatures from Domingo Crespi made in 1407, kept in the Municipal Archives of Valencia.

=== First publication in print between 1436 and 1484 ===
With the advent of the printing press, the first known printed edition is the one of 1436–1484 from Valencia.

=== Barcelona Edition of 1502 (Foreword by Francisco Celelles) ===
Capmany says that because of these adaptations the first seven chapters dealt with matters that were only useful for Valencia Sea consuls, and several laws and ordinances from Barcelona were added indiscriminately, adding that the rest of chapters of the ordinations that form the biggest part of the Book of the Consulate of the Sea was not copied from Mallorca and Valencia, but was compiled thereof from Barcelona customs known as Free Consulate of the Sea and being those Barcelona's customs compiled before the Valencian ordinations by early printers, have caused confusion in later authors, who have given a Valencian origin when in fact they have originated in Barcelona.

The first edition came out of print on 14 August 1502.

Part I consists of 43 chapters that prescribe methods to choose the consuls of the sea and appellate judges in Valencia, the legal responsibilities of each and the procedural regulations of awards of cases brought before them. Articles 44 and 45 were discarded, probably for being illegible, as shipments concerned towards Alexandria

Part II consisted of Articles 46 to 334 of the laws of the year 1343. The first area of Article 46 to 297, deals with generally accepted customs of maritime trade, while the second area, up to 298 items 334, it deals with the pirates, piracy, armed naval expeditions, convoys, maritime insurance, bills of exchange and other various materials. The original manuscript of the Bibliothèque Nationale de Paris has the following inscription appearing at the end of Article 217: "El llibre acaba aquí. Gloria a Jesus Crist. Amen" ("The book ends here Gloria Jesus Christ, amen.")

==== First Lawyers ====
Article 43 prescribes the oath of office for the lawyers of Mallorca, decreed by James I of Aragon and promulgated before the year 1275. It is not known when or by whom it was imposed an oath to lawyers of Barcelona and other cities.

==== Moliné y Brasés edition of 1914 ====
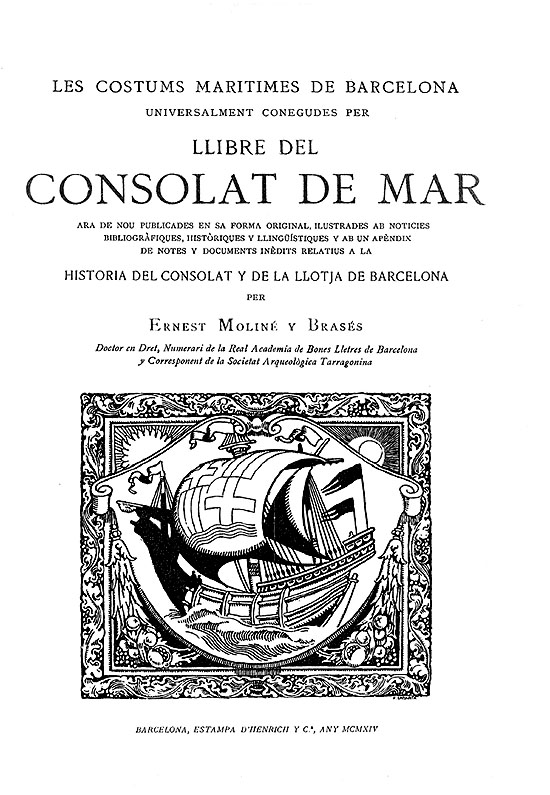
1914 edition of the Book of the Consulate of the Sea, edited by Ernest Moliné and Brases.

One of the most complete editions is due to Moliné y Brasés of 1914, which contains not only the old customs prior to the first compilation but included all subsequent contributions. Contains:

- The regulations of the consuls of Sea from Valencia. (1 to 45)
- The maritime customs of Barcelona. (46–297)
- The arrangements for armed ships that go along armed and leaving the sea. (298–334)
- The chronicle of enactments.
- Chapters of king Oere Terç. (1 to 40)
- The ordinations of 'consuls' of Barcelona for the Consulate of the Sea of Sicily.
- The ordinations of 'consuls' of Barcelona on maritime events of November 21, 1435.
- Laws and ordinations Recognoverunt Proceres on maritime and commercial cases.
- The ordinations of 'consuls' of Barcelona on marine insurance.
- Chapters and ordinations of the General Court of the General Chapter of Barcelona of October 8, 1481.

== Compilations in the antiquity ==
The oldest collection is probably the Babylonian index, from the eighteenth century BC, followed by the "Phoenician customs" compiled in 2000 BC, that were copied by the Greeks and later by the Romans. The people of Rhodes directly adapted the Phoenician laws. The Greeks have founded a Greek colony in Empuries and kept a constant sea trade with Greece following therefore the "Greek costums".

== Compilations from which originated ==
The book was inspired distantly from previous compilations, as the Pisan Constitutum usus (1161) and Breve consulum maris (1162) and the Latin text Consuetudo maris of the first half of the 13th century, which has been documented in Catalonia in 1231.

In 1010 were codified in Amalfi the Tabula Amalphitana or Tavole Amalfi, followed by the codification of maritime customs of Trani in 1063, which were then adapted by the city of Fermo.

In 1243 the king James I of Catalonia has demarcated the Ribera (seaside) of Barcelona and its ordinances were codified in 1258 in the Carta consulatus riparie Barchinone, which had not yet codified the maritime customs of Barcelona itself. Shortly afterwards, Barcelona's municipal boundaries were reorganized and the Ribera (seaside) came under the Consell de Cent, so the Ribera (seaside) lost its autonomy. In the last quarter of the 13th century Barcelona consuls they started naming the great men of the Ribera (seaside), which in 1282 were named "consols de mar" ("consuls of sea").

== Compilations with its influence ==
Many authors believe that the laws specified in the Book of the Consulate of the Sea had a big influence on all other compilations of maritime law in Europe, which are partly based on it.

Some of these laws specified in the Book of the Consulate of the Sea were already adopted in the ninth century in places like the Baltic, the North Sea, the Schleswig sea: Riga, Wisby, Hamburg, Lübeck and other cities of the Hanseatic League, being published since 1407 under the title Waterrecht , also called laws of Wisby.

According to some authors the Rules of Oléron were compiled by Edward I of England and expanded and promulgated by Richard I of England on his return from the Holy Land, but others say Eleanor of Aquitaine would have proclaimed them already in 1160. The fact is that the exact origin of these laws is disputed and, given the lack of communication between sailors of the Atlantic and Mediterranean sailors, it is possible the absence of influence between them. However, laws compiled in the Mediterranean eventually surpassed in importance those of the Atlantic and arrived to replace them, as the Mediterranean countries used to have more maritime activity during several centuries.

The Black Book of the Admiralty of Britain also dates back to the twelfth century.

== See also ==
- Ordinamenta et consuetudo maris
- Catalan cartography
- La Cartografía Mallorquina
- Consulate of the Sea
- Antoni Palau i Dulcet
- Història de la Marina Catalana
- Próspero de Bofarull y Mascaró
- Memorias históricas (Capmany)
- Tartane
- Catalan navy
- Marine sandglass
- Octant projection

== Bibliography ==
- Codigo de las costumbres maritimas de Barcelona: hasta aqui vulgarmente llamado Libro del consulado. en la imprenta de don Antonio de Sancha. 1791. pp. 51–.
- Alexander S. Wilkinson (2010). Iberian Books: Books Published in Spanish Or Portuguese Or on the Iberian Peninsula Before 1601; [IB]. BRILL. pp. 140–. ISBN 978-90-04-17027-8.
- Serna Vallejo, Margarita (2004). Los Rôles d'Oléron. El 'Coutumier' marítimo del Atlántico y El Báltico de época medieval y moderna. Centro de Estudios Montañeses – Santander. ISBN 84-933708-1-9.
