= Catalan navy =

Navy of the counts of Barcelona

- Marina de guerra catalana
- Active: 9th century – 1714
- Disbanded: September 1714
- Country: Principality of Catalonia
- Type: Navy
- Role: Coastal defence Offensive
- Part of: Military of Catalonia
- Engagements: See list: Conquest of Majorca; War of the Sicilian Vespers; War of the Two Peters; Aragonese conquest of Naples; Siege of Barcelona (1713-1714)

Commanders
- Current commander: Vice admiral of Catalonia

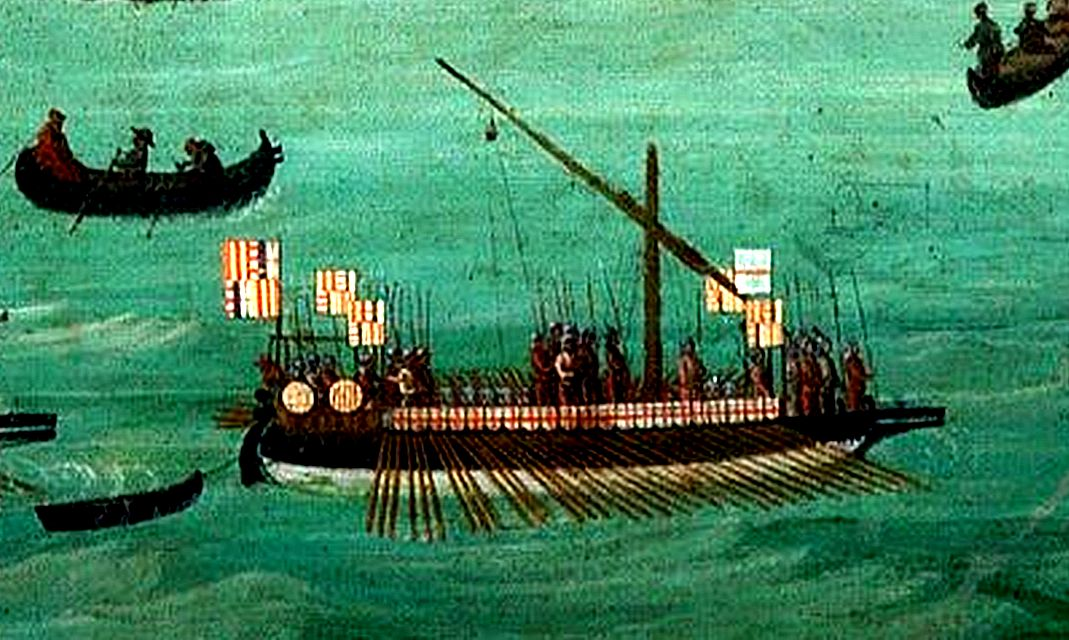
Catalan galley of Admiral Galcerán de Requesens i Joan de Soler, Tavola Strozzi.

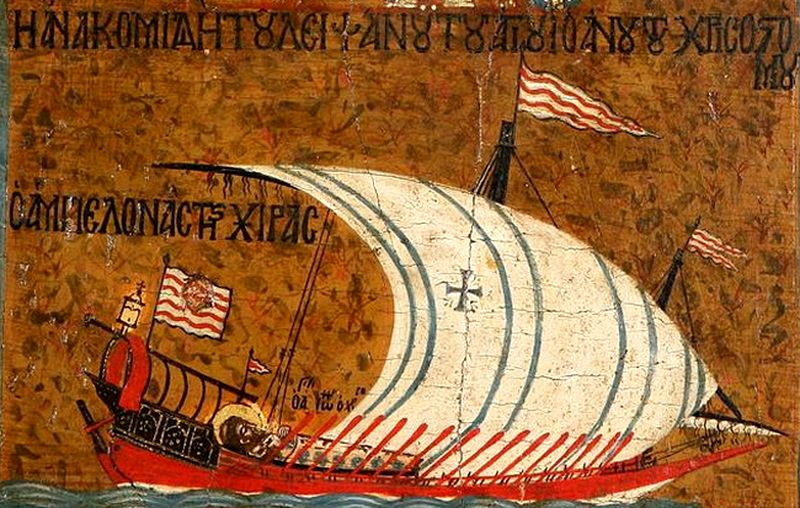
Catalan-style galiota (small galley)

The Catalan navy was the navy from the Principality of Catalonia. It encompassed the Catalan ships, Catalan admirals and Catalan crew, that were under the direct or indirect orders of the counts of Barcelona (i.e. the kings of Aragon, and later the kings of Spain) and represented a reality recognized throughout the Mediterranean from its origins in the 9th century, as stated by Einhard in Annales regni Francorum (c. 830), until Ferdinand the Catholic. In later times, ships built and manned on the Catalan coast, even, some of them, under the authority of non-Catalan kings, such as the kings of Naples, staged some important events.

Similarly, the navies of the kingdoms of Mallorca and Valencia had their own entity and can be studied separately.

== Fame of the Catalan navy ==
The modern generic designation "Navy of the King of Aragon" is inexact and not very descriptive of medieval reality, because until Ferdinand the Catholic, the galleys of the Crown of Aragon were Catalan, Valencian or Majorcan. They were often owned by local institutions (Generalitat, municipalities, etc.). Sometimes they were privately owned, or brought into the service of the king. For quite a long time, the fame of the Catalan army was recognized by many writers:

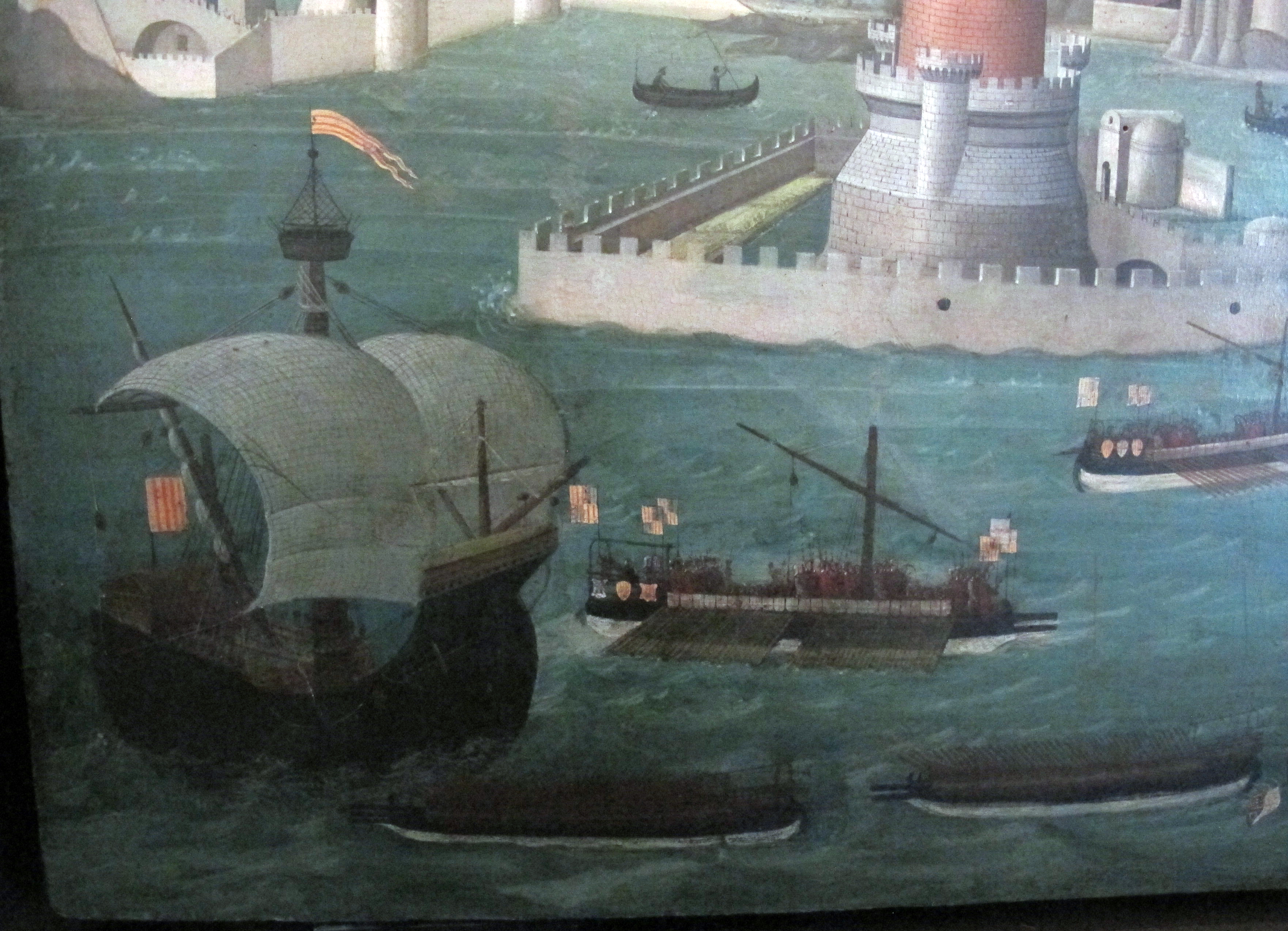
Tavola Strozzi. Galcerán de Requesens i Joan de Soler's fleet returned to Naples after his victory at Ischia (1465).

... "Galea vogia III hommini per bancho ogi, et have XXVIII et XXVIIII banchi. Le fuste vogano dui remi per bancho, et queste sonno de più qualitate de longeçe, ad beneplacitum XII, XVI, XX, XXIIII etc... Et realmente quisto modo de galee ando aptissimamente la nation Catallana et sondo aptissimi allo governo de quelle, perché le altre nationi armano solamente alli bisogni, et li Catalani al continuo fando lo misterio, et ciascheduno ne sa in parte et li Catallani in totum." De navigatione.... Benedetto Cotrugli.,... "Y assí hallamos que, en galeras, los catalanes han hecho más cosas buenas que ningunas otras nasciones, por donde resulta el refrán: 'Que si en galera se haze cosa buena, el capitán á de ser catalán'." Libro tercero de la Crónica de la ínclita y coronada ciudad de Valencia..... Martí de Viciana.,	... "In the Galley row III men per bench, and have XXVIII and XXVIIII bench. In the Lembus row two oars per bench, and these are the most qualified of length, and beneplacit XII, XVI, XX, XXIIII etc... And really this type of galleys are very aptly by the Catalan Nation and are most apt for the government of them, because the other nations arm only to the needs, and the Catalan are armed continuously making the mystery, and what everyone knows partially, the Catalans know totally." De navigatione... Benedetto Cotrugli.,... "And so we find that, in galleys, the Catalans have done more good things than any other nation, hence the saying: 'If a good thing is done in a galley, the captain must be Catalan.'" Third Book of the Chronicle of the illustrious and crowned city of Valencia.. Martí de Viciana.,

== Book of the Consulate of the Sea ==
The Book of the Consulate of the Sea, a Catalonian compendium of Mediterranean maritime law, has an appendix entitled "Ordinations of all Ships who will arm themselves to go to choirs, and of all navies that are faciper sea". The summary note indicates the positions and functions appropriate to the service, as can be seen from its list by subject:

An appendix is the Penal Ordinances for the service of the Navy, made up of 39 articles bearing this heading: "King Peter chapters on maritime facts and acts" (King Peter chapters on the maritime facts and actions) promulgated in Barcelona by royal order in 1430 and which were issued by three notable sailors from Barcelona: Bernat de Cabrera, Jaume Boscà and Joan Llompart.

== Catalan Galleys ==
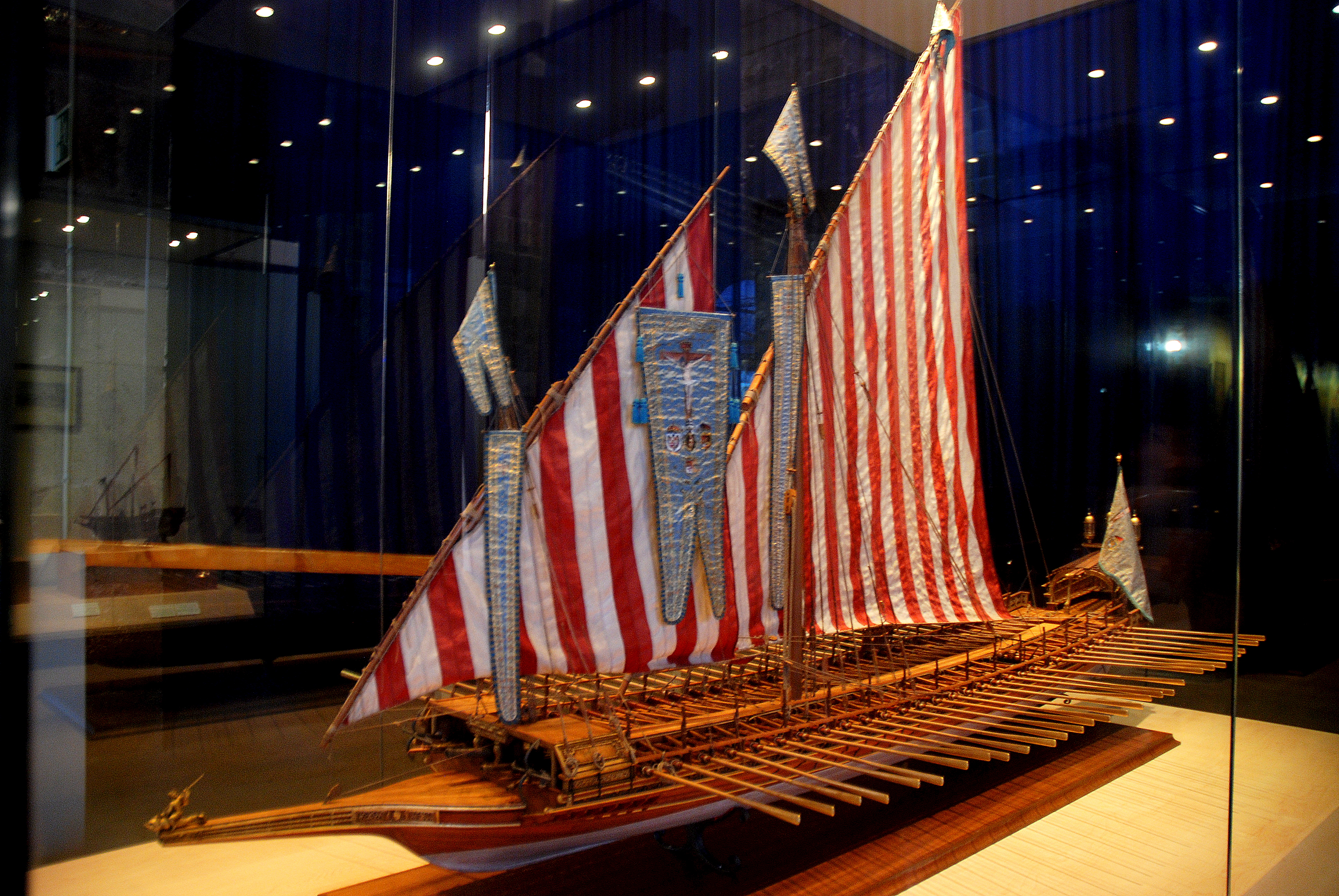
Model of " La Real ".

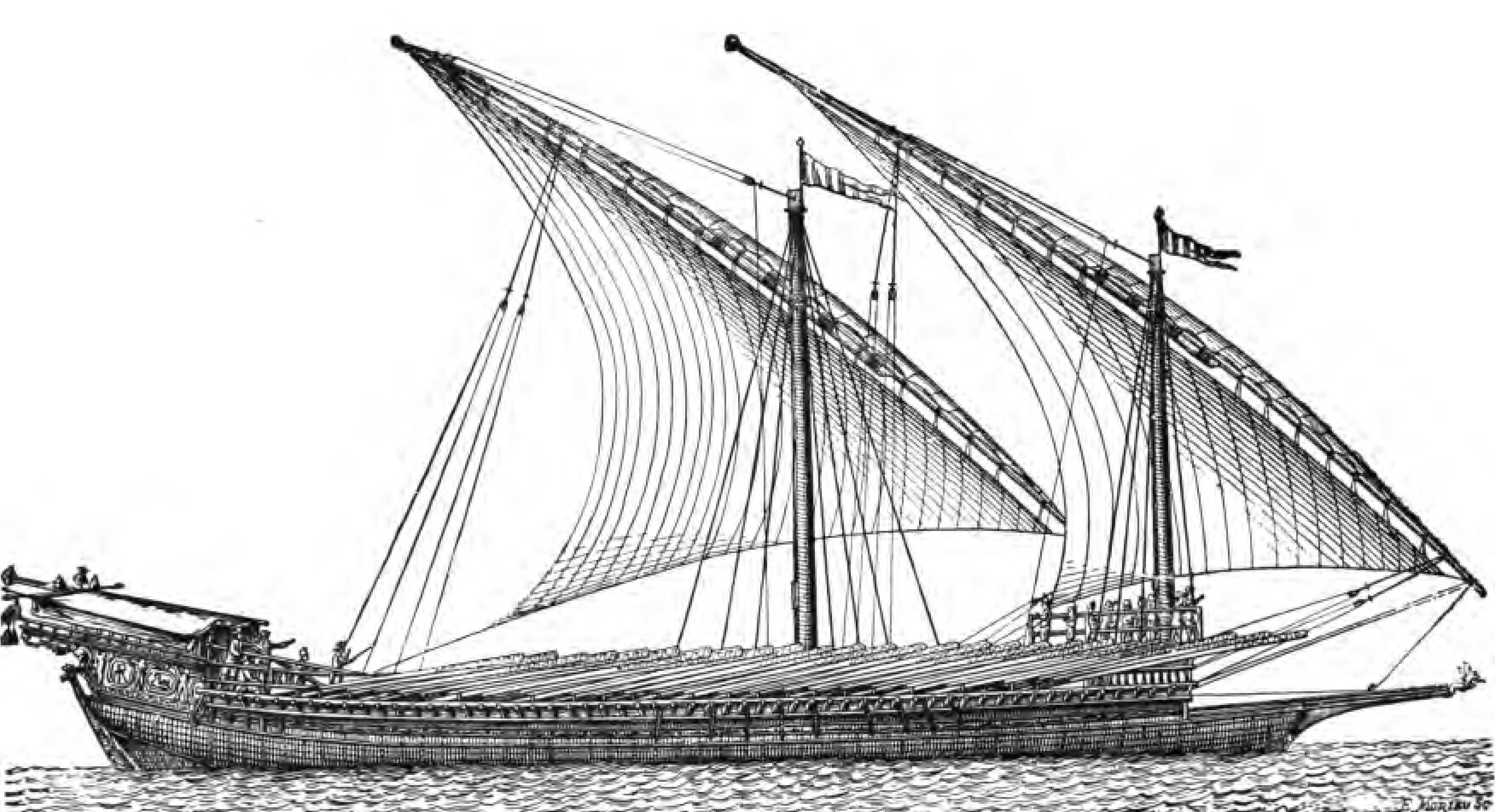
Catalan galley

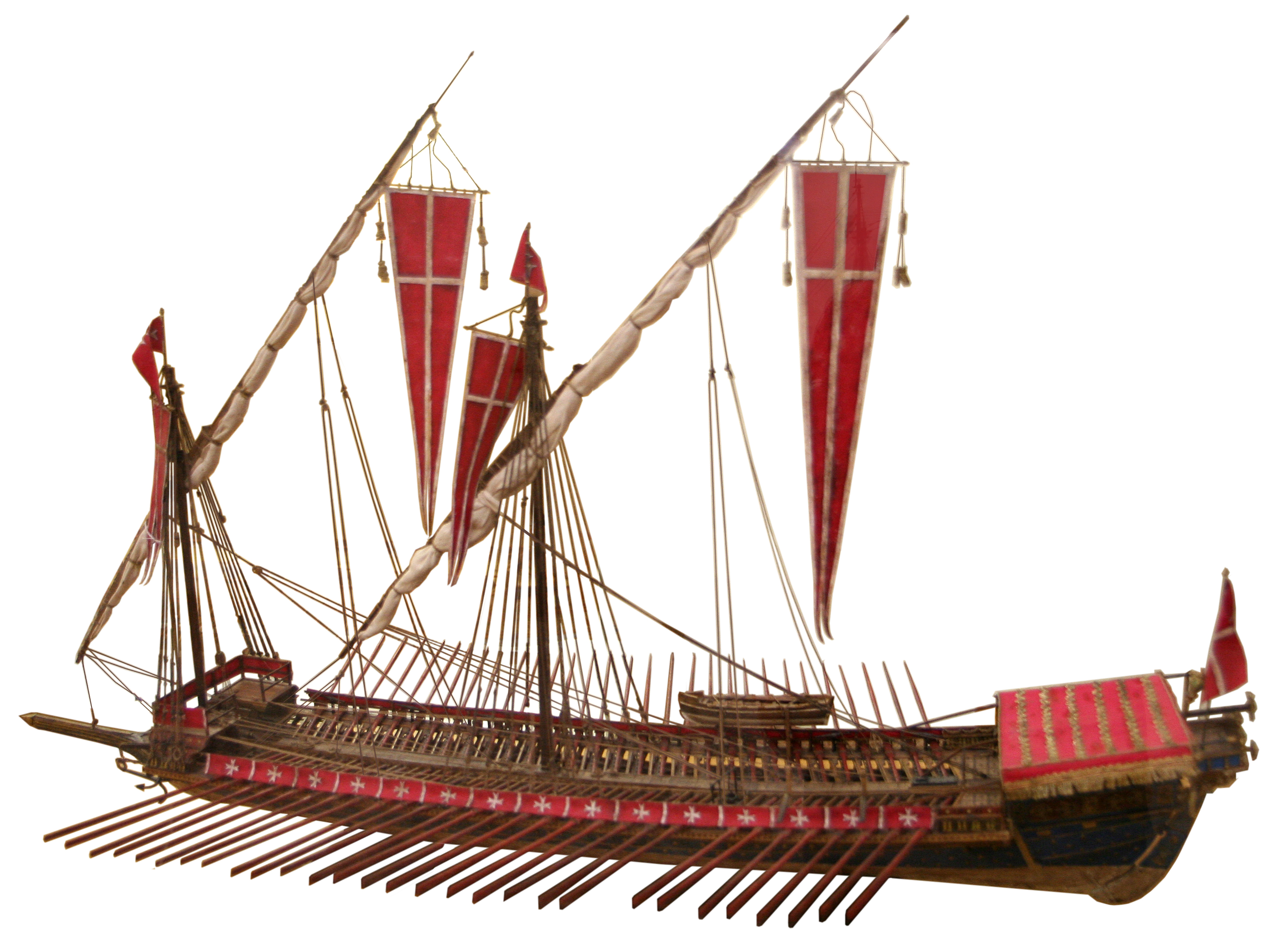
Maltese galley, Catalan variant

The Catalan galley (formerly galea) was a type of ship powered by oars and the wind. Depending on the purpose, it could serve as a warship or as trade ship. It was mentioned in the 13th century by Corominas in his Diccionario crítico etimológico de la lengua castellana, who references a Catalan galley in the year 1120 AD (100 years earlier than all neighboring countries).

The Catalans were building Catalan galleys at least as early of the 12th century, using them for wars with maritime republics or for trade at most Mediterranean ports, guaranteeing trade routes with Catalan consulates.

Their use declined from the seventeenth century onward, when they were progressively replaced by sailboats. They became defunct in the late eighteenth century.

=== Captain's galley ===
The captain's galley was a large galley, accompanied by a subtle, or light, squad of galleys and rowing logs. They regulated their fleet subordination, rewards, punishments, dangers, and profits. The men-in -arms constituted the admiral's guard. In combat, they never had to leave helpless, until they died. Their ordinary armament was the already mentioned crossbowmen, except what the admiral ordered. They were appropriate people for boarding, and they fought on all occasions; his prize was a quarter of the loot, apart from what the admiral could promise. The most desired prey was the cape's armor and all that the enemies wore at the time of the boarding, since once this was accomplished, they prescribed their rights. All the armed people were directly commanded by the so-called constable.

=== Combat ===
On board the Catalan galleys, the battles with other galleys were resolved only on boarding, in which the crews faced each other and, from the 16th century onwards, with arquebus fire. Sometimes the oarsmen also joined the fight.

Compared to the medium-sized galleons, which had twelve to twenty guns of greater caliber and range, the galleys had a fragile structure that was not very resistant to enemy fire, with a maximum of five guns at the bow. In combat the low structure of the galleys was overwhelmed by the high edges of the galleons, while their crew fired from the higher decks.

=== The crossbowmen "in table" ===
Crossbowmen were the most important offensive forces aboard a traditional galley. And they coexisted for many years with the arquebussers and artillerymen. Ramon Muntaner was a supporter of professional crossbowmen, only recruited to act as crossbowmen (crossbowmen hired on the table to be agreed; hence the name "on board").

It was mandatory that every sailor with crossbowman duties in the galleys, had to have two crossbows with two feet and another one with a strap (that had a strap to arm it), three hundred pins, a steel helmet, a stitching (it could be the union of weight and point: heavy-point) or breastplate and sword or saber. The same armament had to be carried by crossbowmen ex officio in smaller ships.

- The galleys were the same. Normal galleys only carried two rowers per bank: a dovecote and a postic. The galleys with third parties went with a third rower in each bank: the thirdol. They were faster but the number of professional crossbowmen was smaller.
- Some foreign scholars translated (without justification or success) the "table" by a type of castle or protection reinforcement that only the Catalan galleys had.
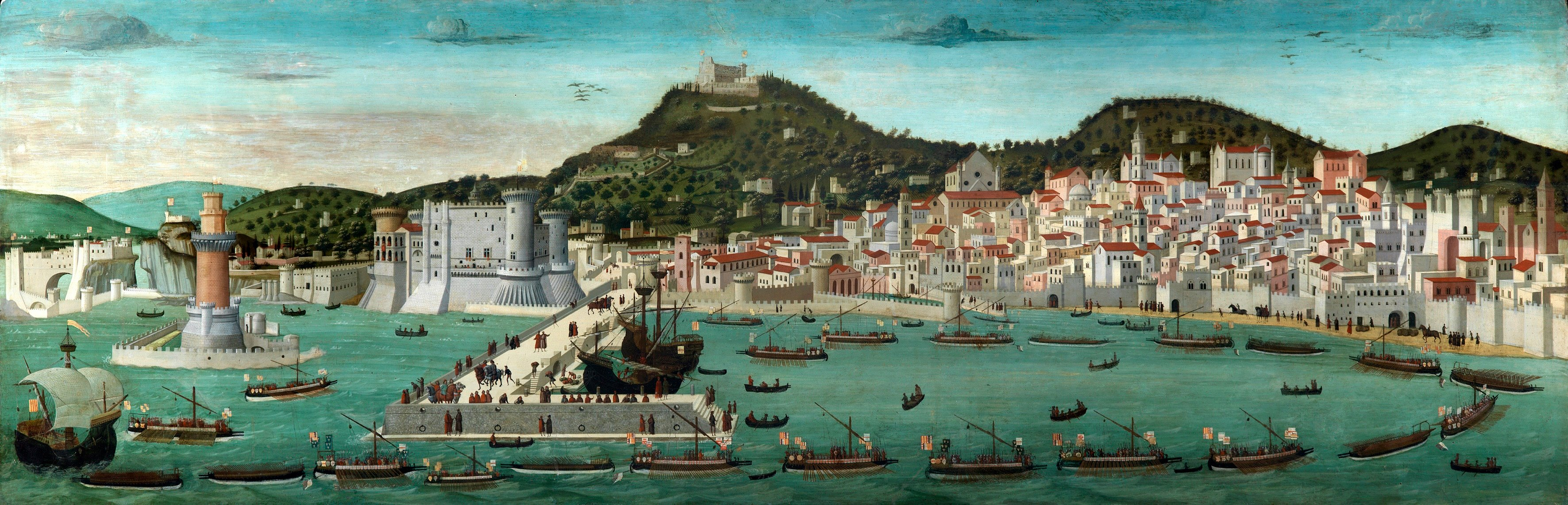
Tavola Strozzi. Flota de Galceran de Requesens y Joan de Soler volviendo a Nápoles después de su victoria en Ischia

== Catalan tartanes ==
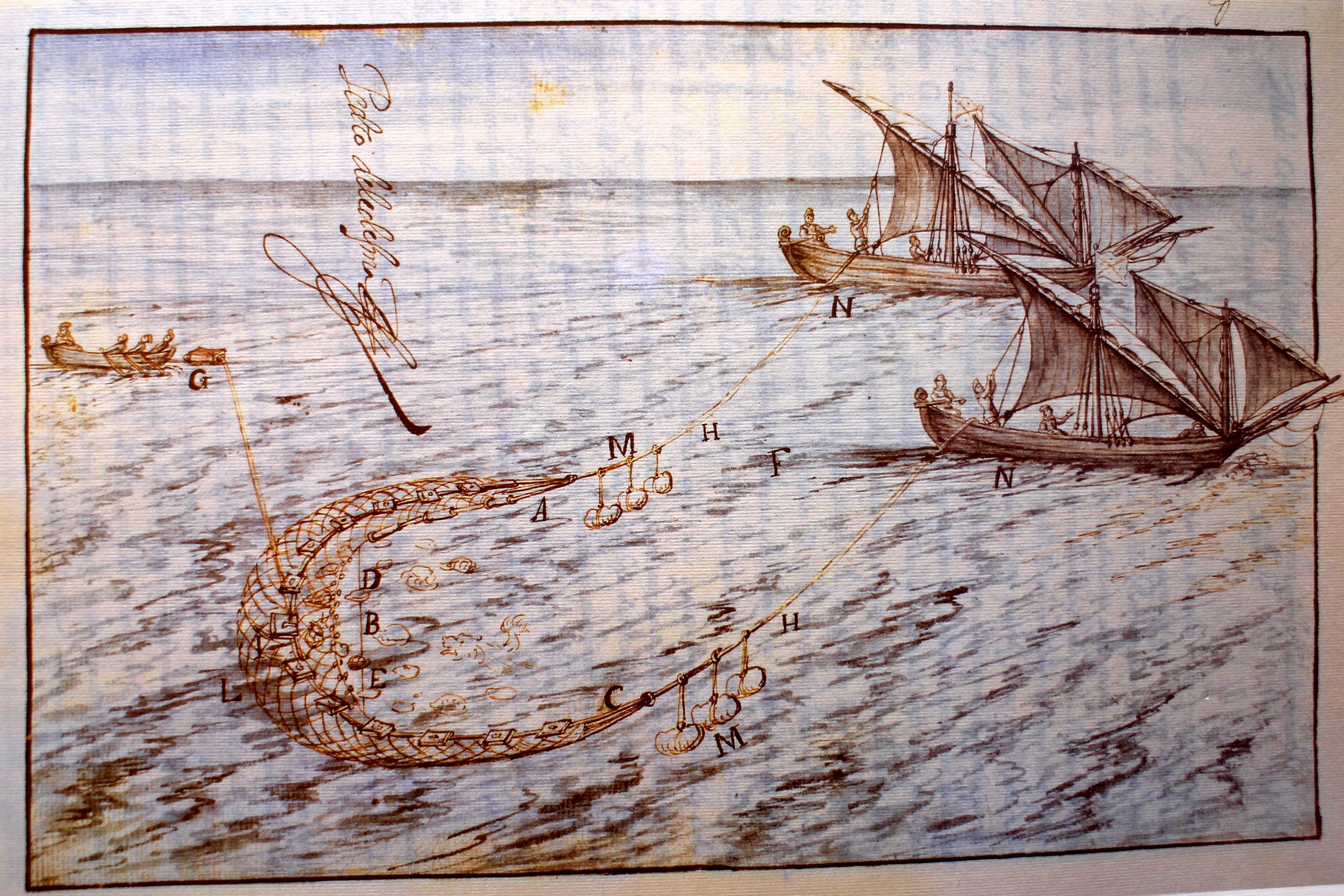
Tartane de Nicolás de Cardona fishing pearls

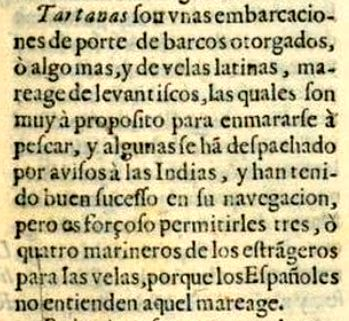
Definition of tartane: Veitia and Lineage 1670.

Tartane in English and in most European languages (although in some it changes to tartana or tartan ) is a small Mediterranean Latin sail boat (or bow-stern rig ) used between the 16th and 19th centuries. The different tartanes were used as couriers, for cabotage, as fishing boats, and as warships. In their more than three hundred years of history, they had different designs, different numbers of masts and even varied sailing gear.

Low on board, the tartanes measured between 16 and 20 metres, with a mast perpendicular to the keel planted in the middle, in which a Latin sail (master sail) and a jib called the polacia were hoisted. There are many cases of mizzen candle tartanes and other cases without mizzen candle.

José Veitia Linaje (1670) refers to the tartanes as levantisco tide, being used in navigation to the Indies. In the work Norte de la Contratación (Seville, 1672), he points out that: "Tartanes... of Latin sails, lifting of levantisks... but it is necessary to allow them 3 or 4 sailors from foreigners ("levantisks") for the sails, because the Spaniards do not understand their maneuver"..." (referring to the maneuver of the Latin sails). Veitia was the Official Judge of the Royal Audience of the Casa de Contratación de las Indias. Reinforcing this fact, the Bulletin de la Société de géographie explains that "a 14-year-old boy practical of a Catalan tartane, at that age had already made the trip to Havana three times".

== Origin ==
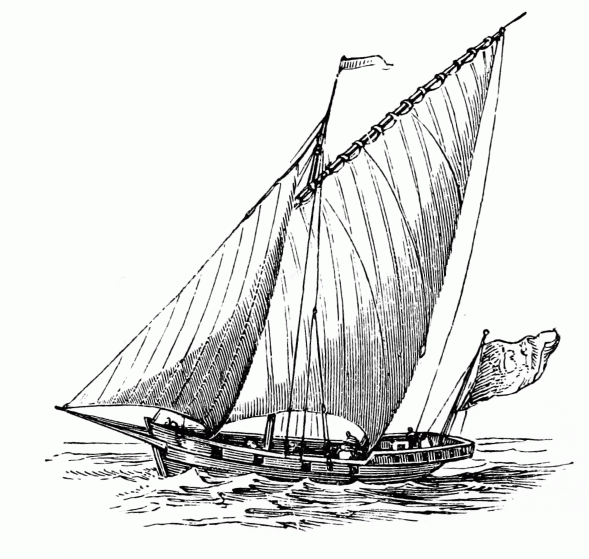
Engraving of a tartane

There is a reference to tartane as a boat in 1313 in Catalonia, in which the king of Roussillon and Mallorca commanded: "do not wish to fish in the sea for the lord king ab tartans".

Tartanes were present in the Western Mediterranean from the Middle Ages until the advent of the steam bous, especially in Occitania where these boats were traditional along the Languedoc, Catalonia and Provence coasts for fishing and cabotage throughout the Mediterranean. By extension the same name was also given to fishing nets.

Towards the 16th century there is news of a single deck tartane with three small masts in Provence (France). Regarding its military use, one of the first mentions of the tartane in the 17th century is found in the 1614 book, Pantero-Pantera "el Armata Navale", where there is an explanation of the maneuvers of the tartanes of the French navy.

== Etymology ==
On the origin of the name, there are several sources that refer to the Occitan tartane (a bird of prey), being in Catalan tartana, Italian: tartana and French: tartane.

According to studies on the basis of linguistic and literary analysis, the origin of the tartanes would be the coasts of the Gulf of León (Roussillon in 1313) where they were initially of smaller dimensions. The word is present in several languages, and some authors claim that it comes from the Arabic taridah which means ship.

But it is accepted by Corominas and others who defend that its etymology is Occitan by loan of the meaning, since the same Tartane word also designates the common buzzard or other birds of prey, and its origin would be onomatopoeic by imitating the cry of the bird when hunting.

== Images of tartanes ==
Jean Jouve in the album Plans of all ships sailing the Mediterranean Sea (in French, Dessins de tous les Bâtiments qui Naviguent sur la Méditerranée) from 1679, shows these four images of single-mast tartanes:

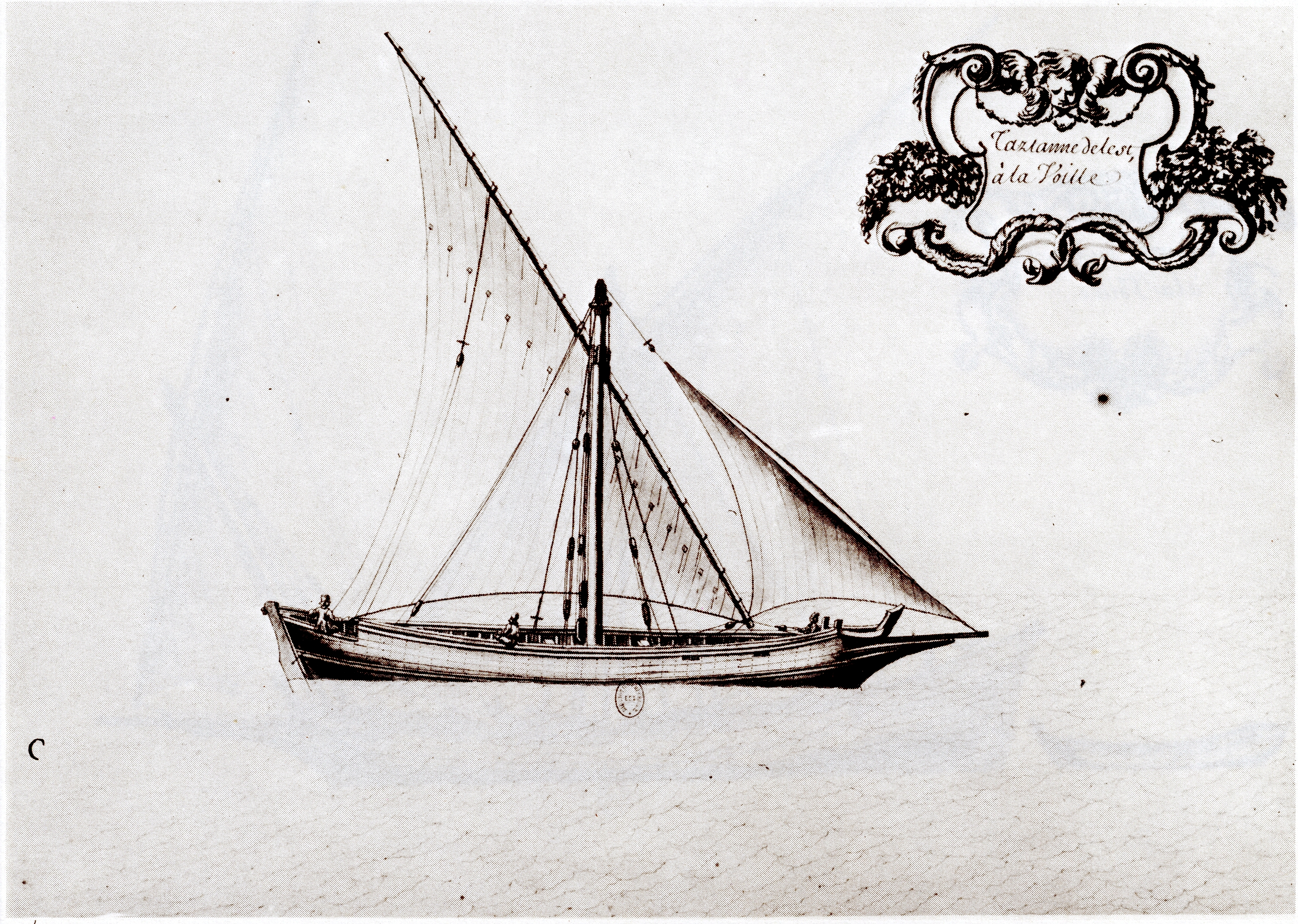

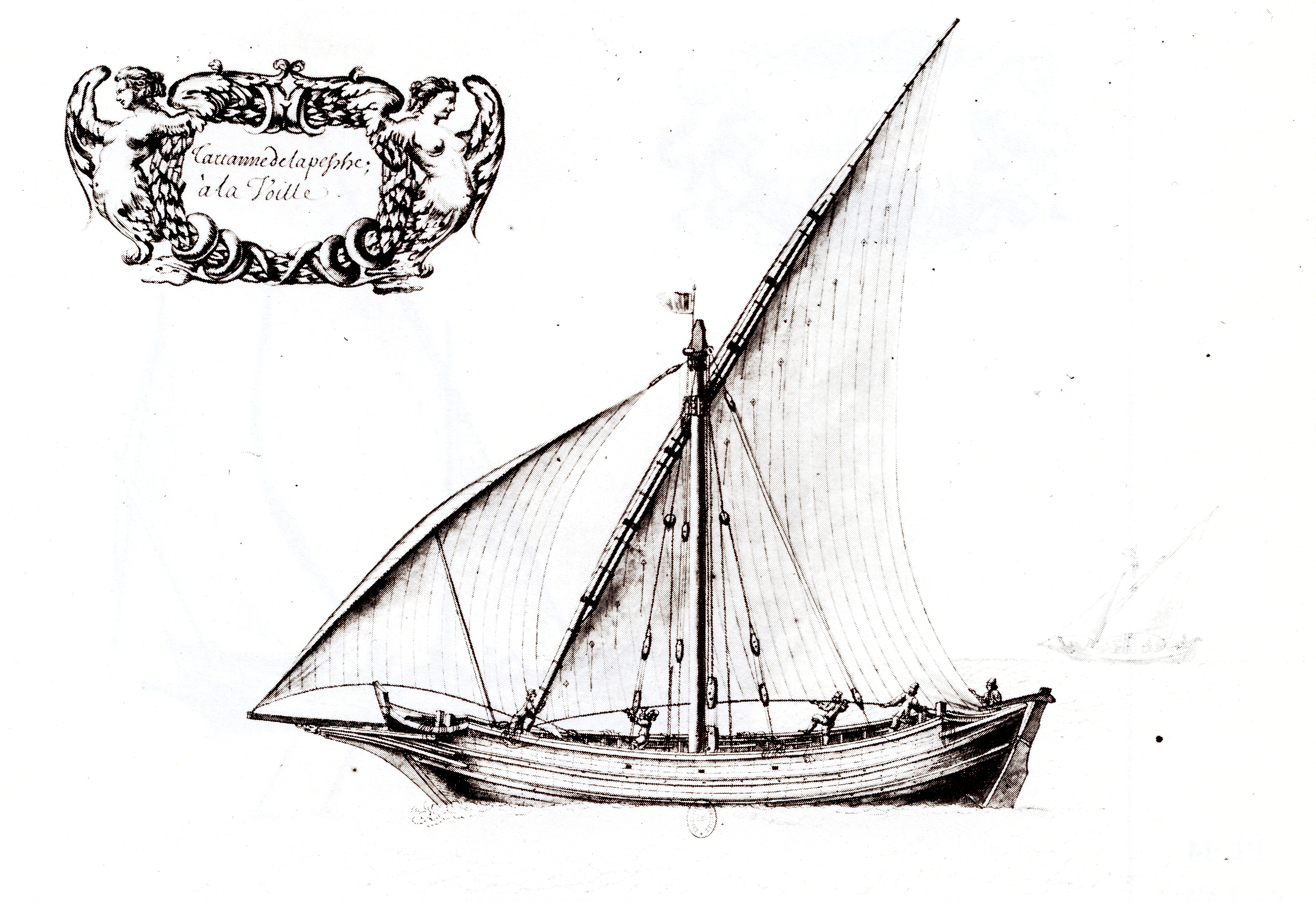

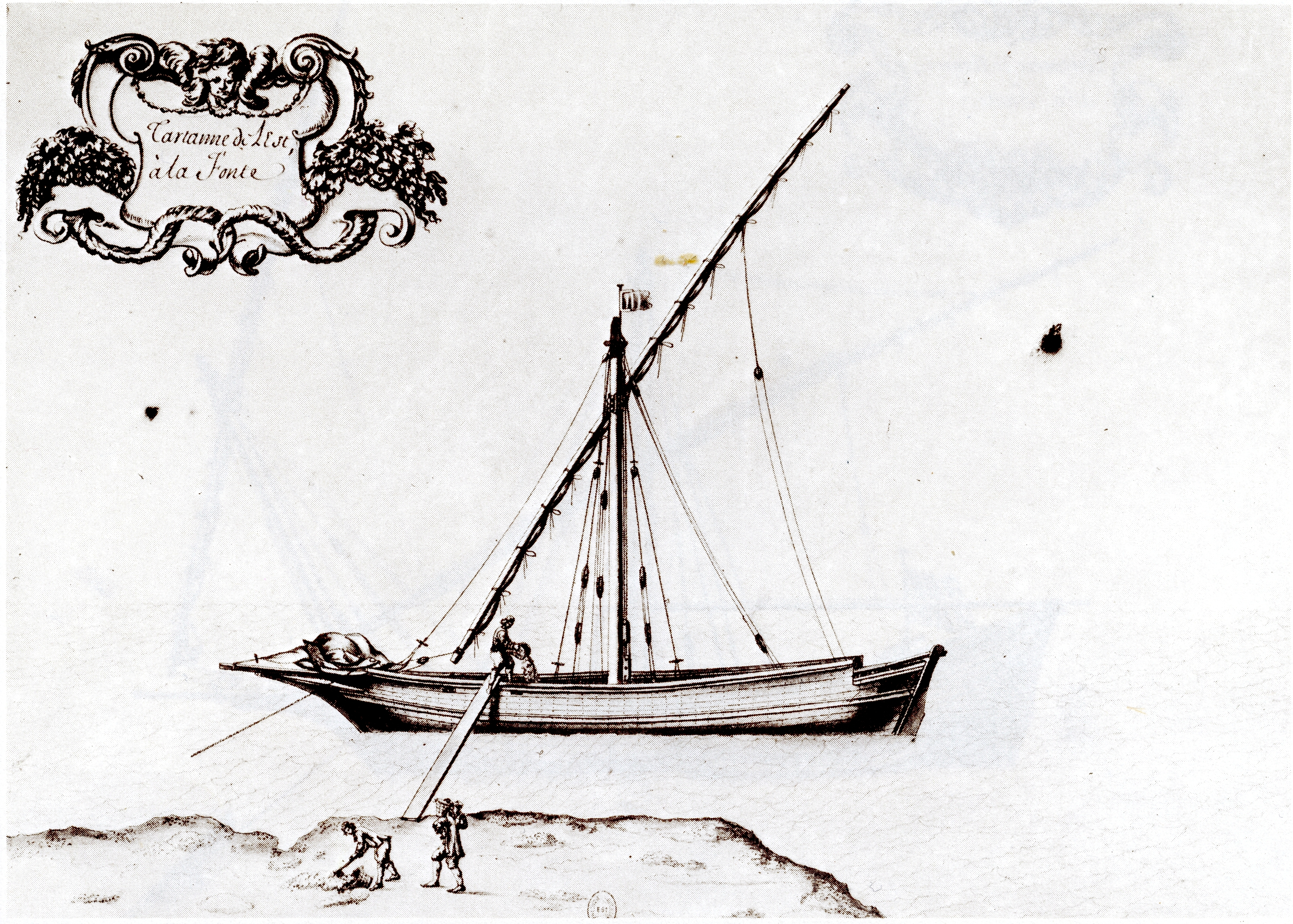

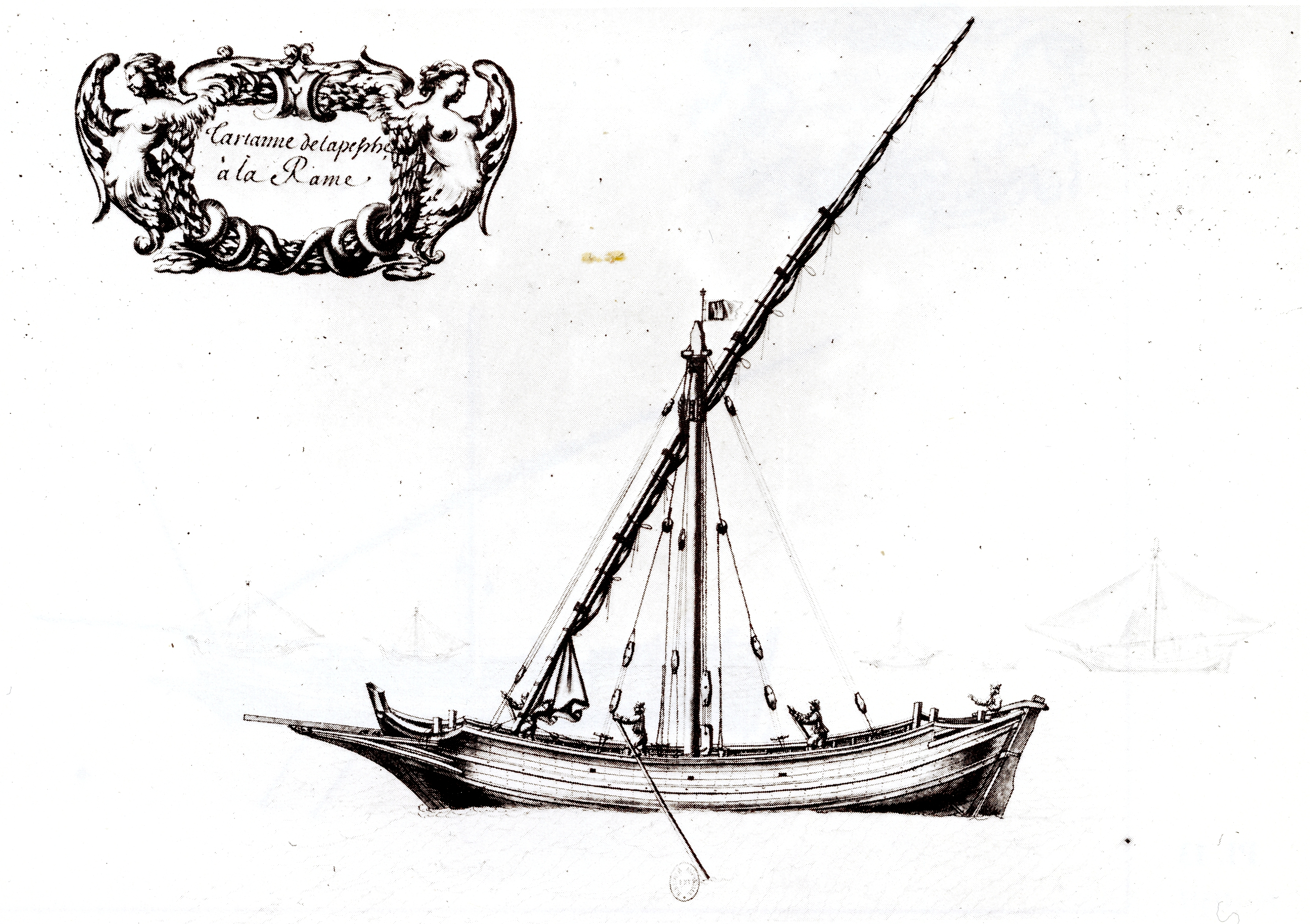
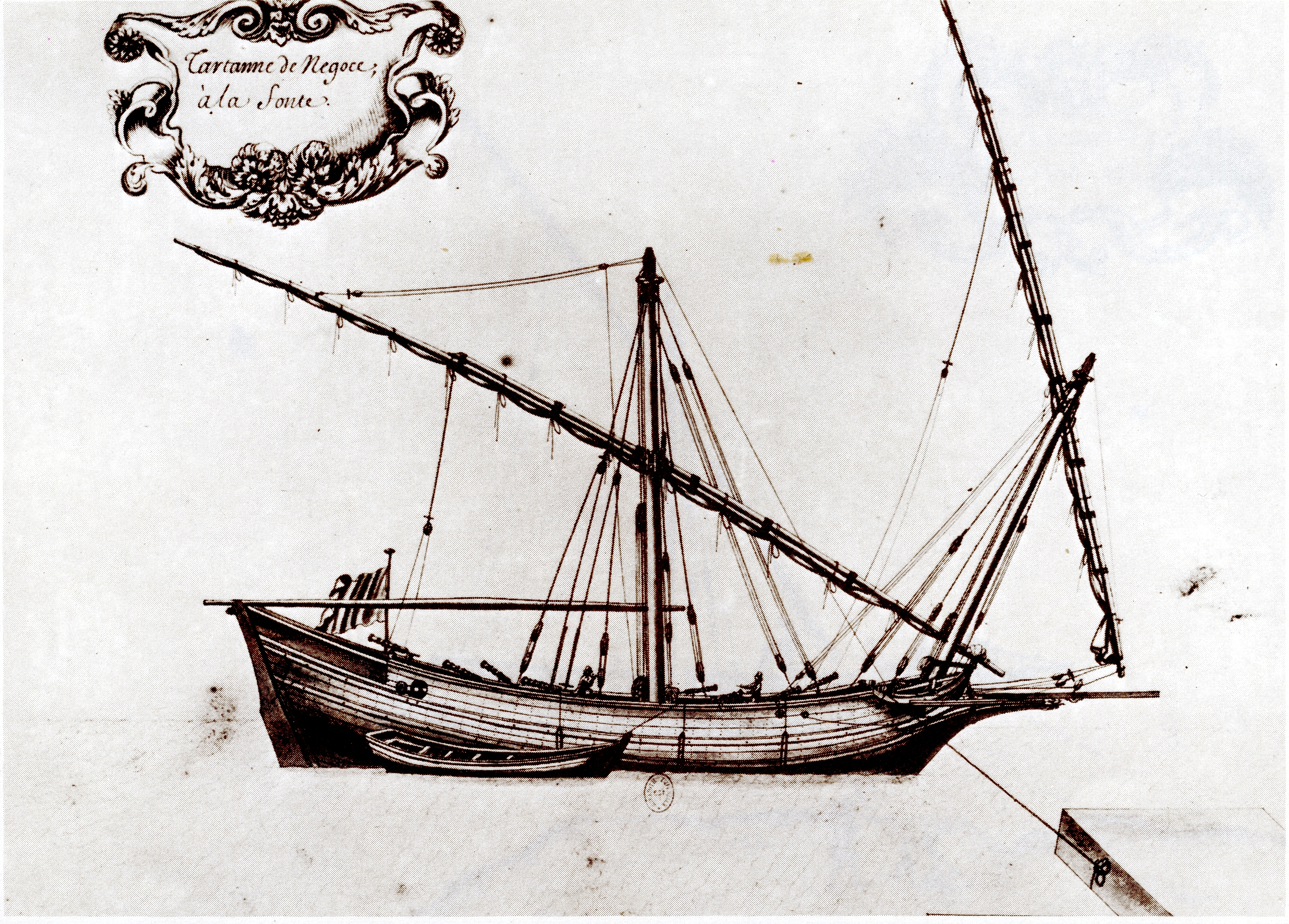

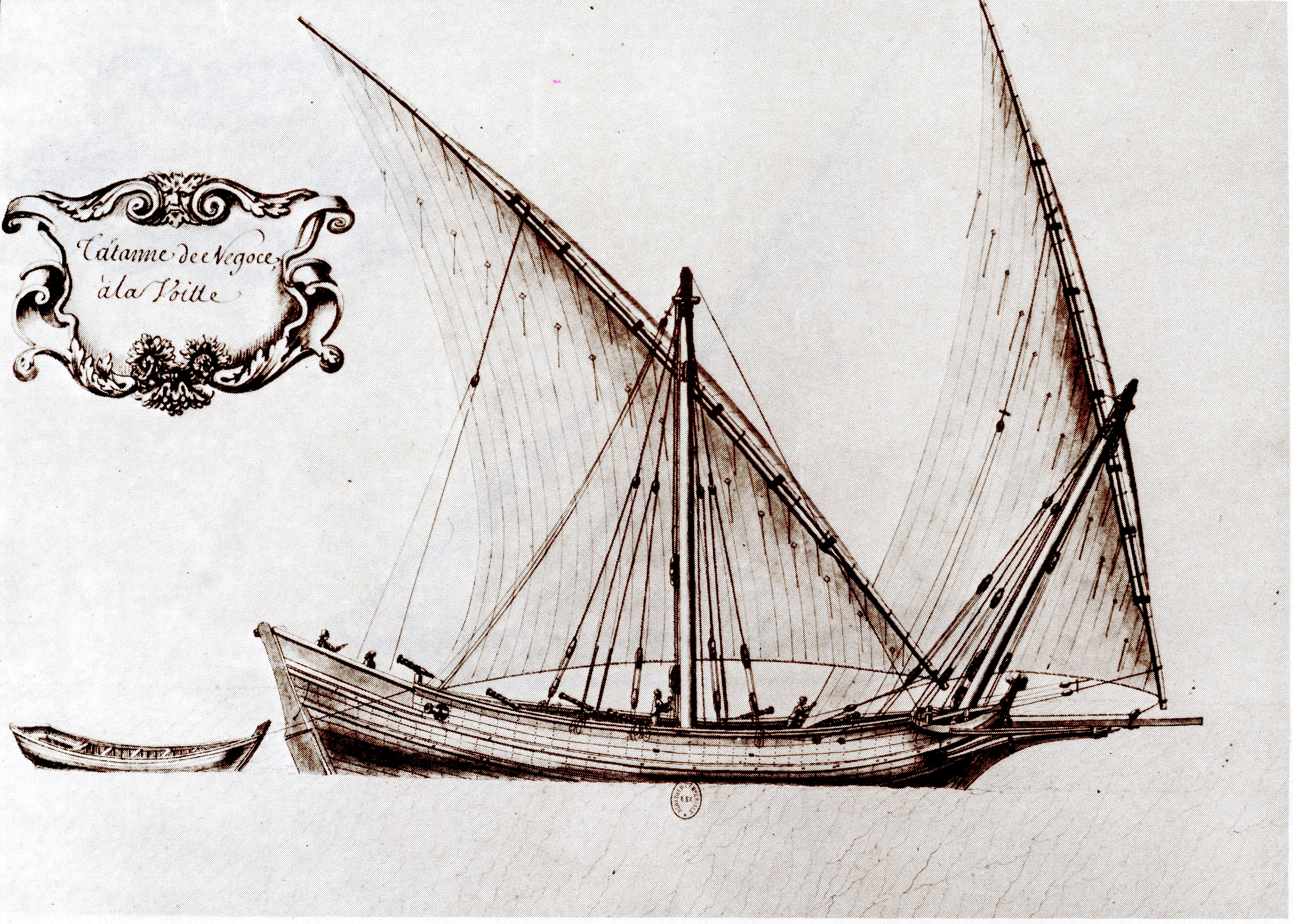

== Bilge pump on Catalan ships ==
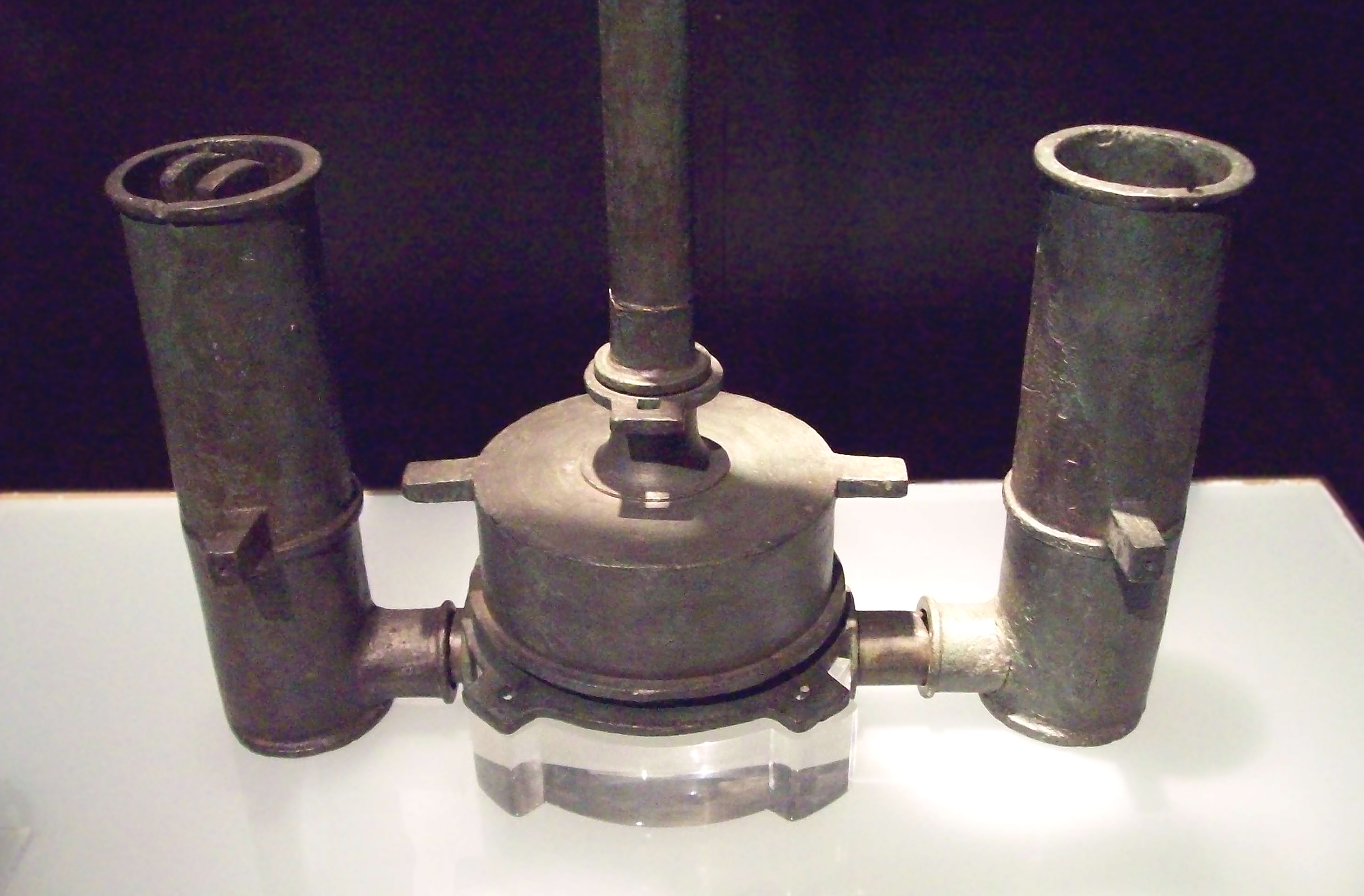
Roman bronze pump (3rd century, Huelva)

In the high Middle Ages there does not seem to be any reference of any kind.

In pre-modern times there are some refs:

- In 1460, Miquel de Gualbes, from Barcelona, commissioned the master of Azuela de Mataró, Luis Pou, among other things: "... two beautiful round shafts for two horns, which are beautiful, from lonch and grux, to the sanity of the master finger". The "two shafts" characterize the suction-impeller type pump.
- In an inventory of the shipyards of Barcelona in 1467 you can read: "a sgotar horn".
- Some verses from the poem Luigi Pulci "Il morgante maggiore" 1487 speak of how: "la tromba aggottava".
- In 1460, Girolamo Cardano describes one.

== Barcelona bombards warehouse ==
According to the Chronicle of San Juan de la Peña (in 1359), in the middle of the fourteenth century the Catalan galleys (those of the other nations took a little longer), began to be armed with bombers on board, the fact was so important and secret that the committees took them out of a warehouse in Barcelona, forced to sign a document in which they said that they would not transfer them to any foreign nation under pain of death if they did so: "... the artillery that they took out as rented in the large warehouse bombardment, in the so-called General's Warehouse in Barcelona. They generally carried a central bay bombardment plus a few smaller caliber pieces to port and starboard. The power of these bombards, especially the side ones, was limited because the recoil from the shots shook the ship.

== Shipyards of Barcelona ==
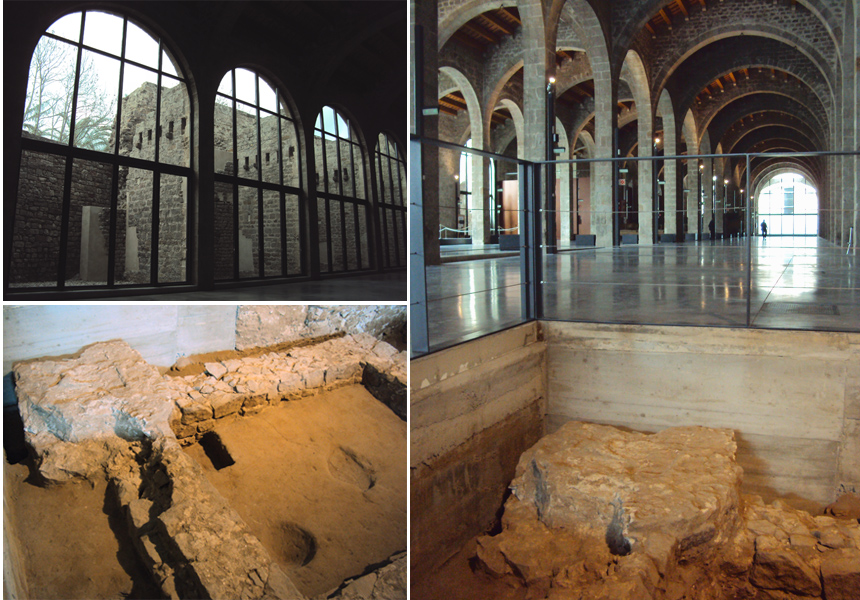
New interior view of the wall, mausoleum and side nave (2013)

The shipyards of Barcelona, where all kinds of ships were built until the end of the 17th century, can be considered a great production complex from the Medieval Period and the Modern age, a true great modern factory: where hundreds of men worked, with their various activities, supported by the corresponding guilds, from their neighborhood inside the wall. The galleys were built "in series", anticipating the shapes of the modern assembly line. The productive capacity of Barcelona was impressive for the time: in 1571, in the imminence of the Battle of Lepanto, fifty ships were launched ready to go to Italy and Greece.

In the battle of Lepanto, the Catalans (among others) experienced with great results the galleys made in Barcelona. They were larger and more stable galleys that could load batteries of large-caliber guns and fire in all directions; instead, it was impossible to maneuver the galleys with the oars, so they had to be towed by two smaller galleys.

== Dead-reckoning in the Catalan Navy ==
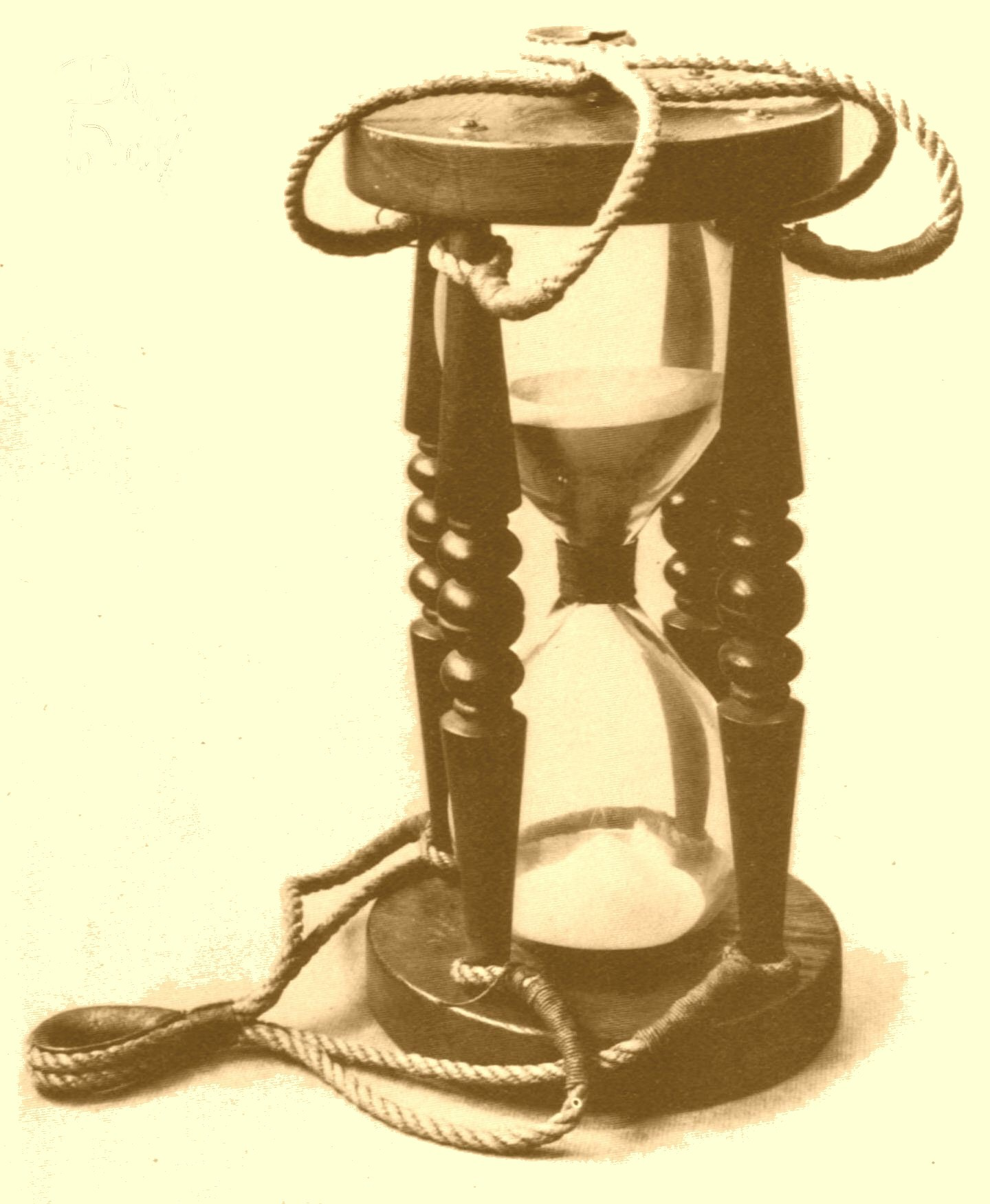
Reversible bulb with a "hanging" support with four columns

With the Atlantic navigations of the time of the discoveries – apart from the compass – the tables, the astrolabe and the rod of Jacob or the quadrant were necessary, but it must be said that during these navigations – like the Mediterranean navigations – the distance navigated calculated by estimate, and, "navigation by appreciation" is not possible without an instrument to measure time.

=== Marine sandglass ===
For more than 500 years (from 1300 to 1800) the instrument for measuring time at sea was "the Ampoule of hours". In Catalonia there are references of its manufacture since the middle of the 14th century made of Catalan transparent glass according to the formulas of the alchemist Guillem Sedacer, using as a fundent the soda obtained by burning the barrella (its ashes dissolved in water and cast with a sieve have been the basis from the "laundry" to wash clothes from the Neolithic). The barrella grows on the Catalan coast from Orihuela to Montpellier and the Italian manuals for making Italian glass (La Sedacina and Arte Vetraria) say: "bisogna comprare la soda di Spagna".

In an extensive inventory of the things owned by Charles V of France that were in his possession at the time of his death on 16 September 1380. There is an article cited as "heures de naviguer" from the king's study to his castle at Saint Germain in Laye, which is described as follows:

Item ung grant orloge de mer, de deux grans fiolles plains de sablon, en ung grant estuy de boys garny d'archal. [Item a large sea clock, with two large phials filled with sand, in a large wooden brass-bound case.]

This "orloge de mer" or "heures de naviguer" was sent to him, as a gift, when he was still just a prince (being, therefore, before 1356 when he took the place of his father in prison), by John the hunter, through his daughter Yolande of Aragon, when John asked to send him a manuscript by Jean de Mandeville, "to translate it into the Aragonese language". This point is essential to know the language of the original, since it does not say "to translate it into the Catalan language", which would have been the most important action, because Catalan was their language - this fact therefore implied, that there was no need for a translation into Catalan - on the other hand, if there would have existed in Catalonia, a copy in Catalan language, John wouldn't have asked his daughter for an original, this fact proves that the manuscript in the hands of Yolande of Aragon was written in Catalan.

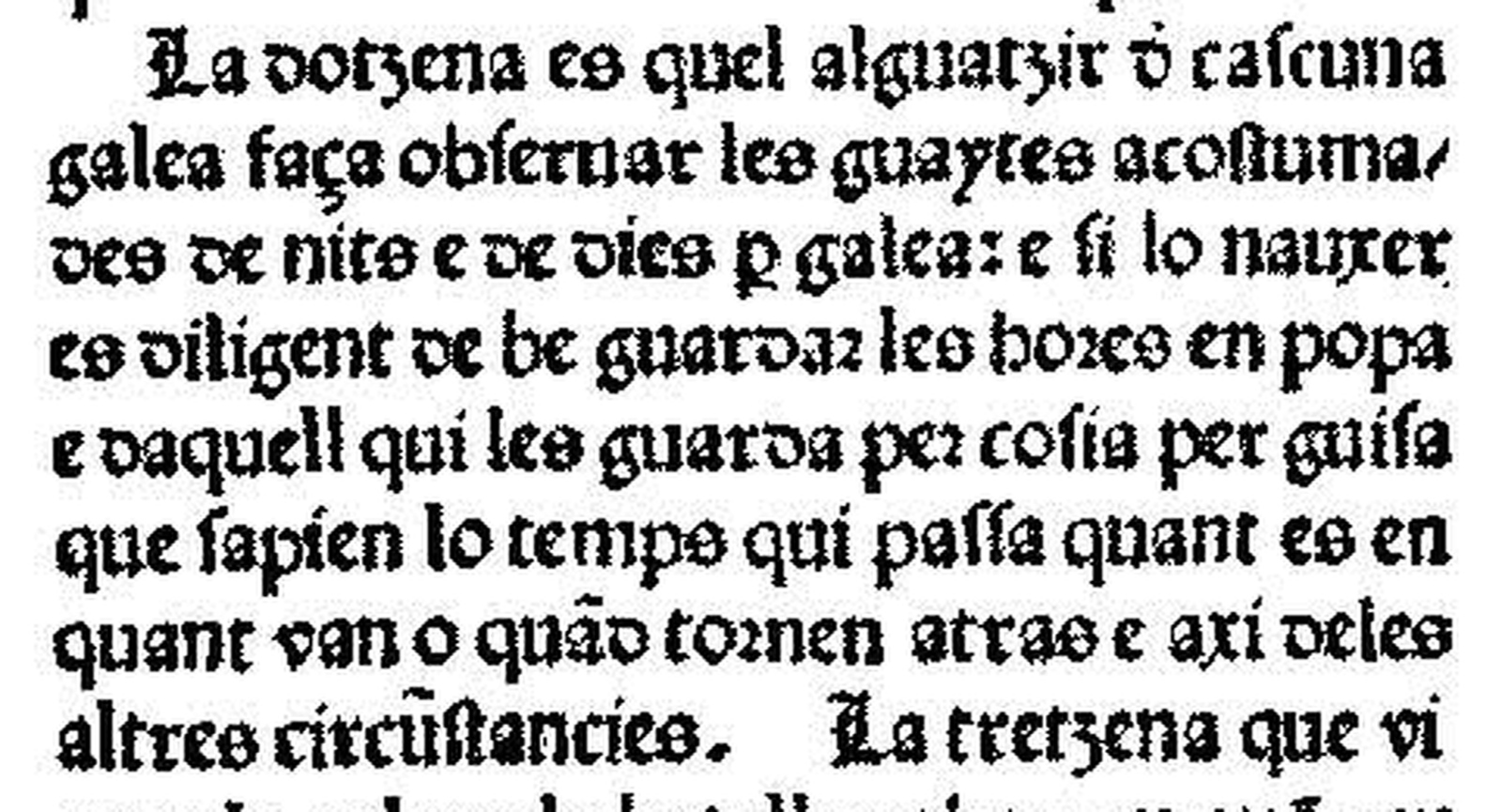
Francesc Eiximenis: Dotzé del Crestià (Valencia-1484)

The most interesting of this reference from Charles V of France, is that an hourglass is defined as "ung grant orloge de mer" ("a great sea watch"), this together with the fact that the first explanation of its use at sea it appears in "the twelfth of the Crestià" (work by M.Llauradó on Francesc Eiximenis) and that it was given to him by Johan de Hunter by means of his daughter Yolanda de Aragón, suggests that, in this period, the importance of an hourglass was commonly related to its use at sea and its manufacturing demand, it could have originated from the navigation needs of the Catalan navy a maritime power of the moment in the Mediterranean.

- Francesc Eiximenis in the Dotzé del Crestià spoke of naval warfare and of the discipline and order to be observed on ships. Regarding the measurement of time, he wrote what appears in the picture:
- In French galleys no reference could be found until the French manuscript Stolonomie from the years 1547–1550, where it says that each galley must carry: "... Quatres ampoulletes à sablon pour mestré les gardes à heures...". A phrase very similar to the Catalan Eiximenis.

== Campaigns ==
The "Spanish Way", with its main and secondary variants, went from Barcelona and Naples to Brussels, via Genoa-Milan.

The most famous campaigns where these ships fought, with several hundred galleys taking part in both, were the Lepanto campaign (1571) and the Invincible Army campaign (1588). Despite the fact that the history books do not recognize Catalan participation, the secret Venice-England archives released to the public say the opposite:

Other important campaigns:

- Mediterranean campaign of Alfonso the Magnanimous 1420–1423. All the troops of Alfonso the Magnanimous embarked the galleys in Barcelona.
- Granada campaign with the siege of Malaga, in 1492: "the royal was left without gunpowder and the king sent two galleys to Valencia and Barcelona for it" (Cura de los palacios)
- Wars of Italy: All the troops of Ferdinand the Catholic (as well as those of his uncle Alfonso the Magnanimous) embarked the galleys in Barcelona.
- Tunis Campaign in 1535: All the troops (as well as Charles V and his cohort ) embarked on the galleys in Barcelona.

In the following wars the Spanish thirds (as well as Charles V and his cohort) went in Catalan galleys from Barcelona to Genoa and the Italian thirds from Naples to Genoa, there they took the Spanish way to their destination

- Smalkald's War 1546–1547
- Flanders War 1548–1568

=== Battle timeline ===
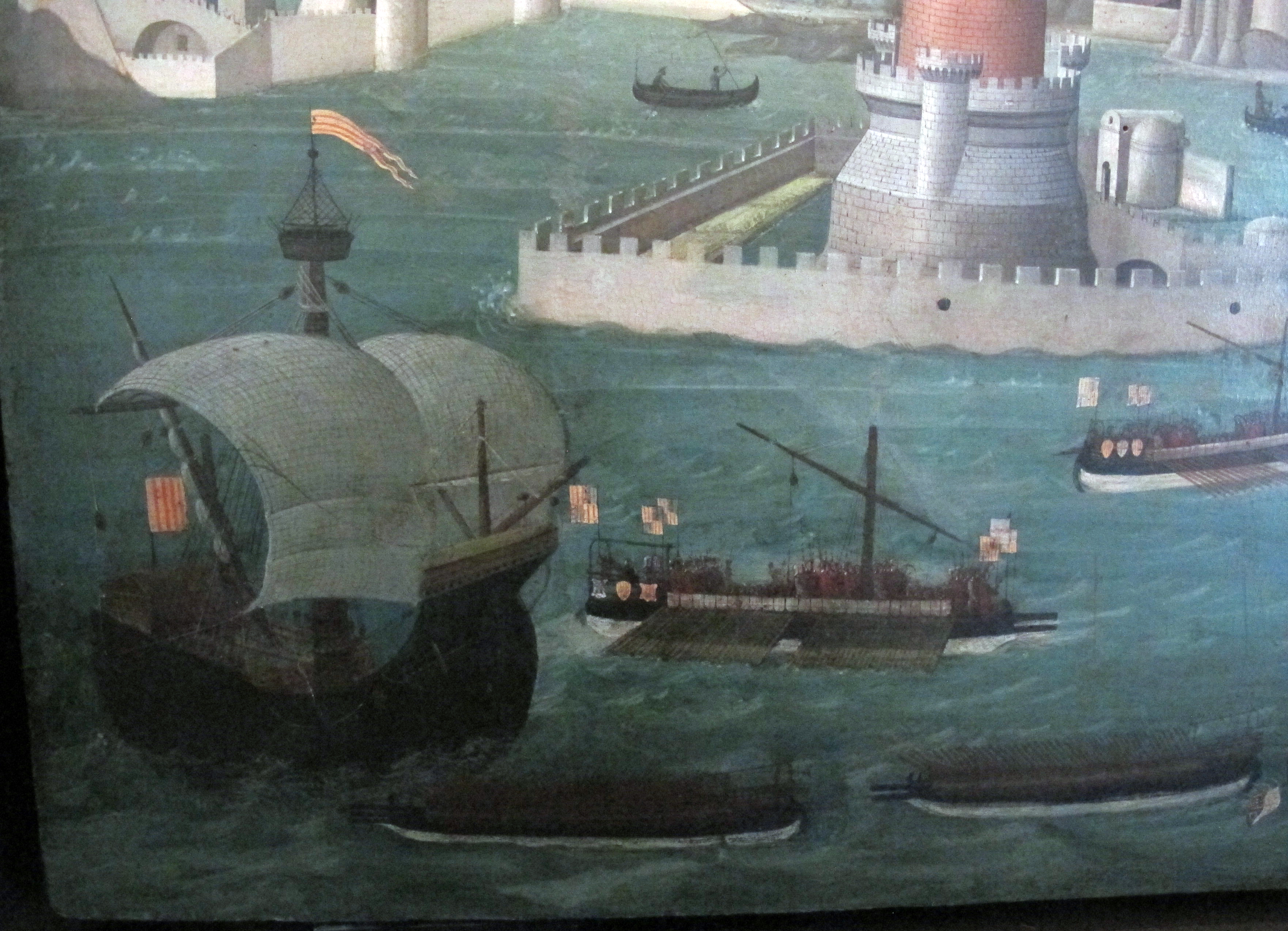
Detail of the Tavola Strozzi. Boats returning to Naples after the Battle of Ischia (1465).

- Nicothen Combat 1282
- Combat of Malta 1283
- Naples Golf Battle 1284
- Naval battle of Sant Feliu de Guíxols 1285
- Formigues Naval Battle 1285
- Battle of the Counts 1287
- Battle of Cape Orlando 1299
- Battle of Gagliano 1300
- Naval Battle of Cagliari 1324
- Bosporus Naval Battle 1352
- Zonklon Naval Battle 1352
- Naval battle of Puerto del Conde 1353
- Barcelona naval battle (1359)
- Bône Naval Battle 1360
- Siege of Boniface 1420
- Battle of Foç Pisana 1421
- Looting of Marseille 1423
- Calvi Siege 1429
- Ponza Naval Battle (1435)
- Battle of Ischia 1465 (plot of the Barons)
- Siege of Kefalonia 1500
- Day of Meros el-Kebir 1506
- Conquest of Oran 1509
- Siege of Bejaïa (1514)
- Battle of Formentera (1529)
- Tunis Day 1535
- Battle of Préveza 1538
- Battle of Girolata 1540
- Battle of the Alboran Island 1540
- Algiers Day 1541
- Siege of Nice (1543)
- Battle of Gerba (1560)
- Siege of Malta (1565)
- Battle of Terceira Island 1582
- Battle of Lepanto

=== Pisano-Catalan Crusade ===
The Pisano-Catalan Crusade to the Balearic Islands, which at the time was a Muslim taifa, consisted of an expedition in retaliation for the acts of piracy committed by the Muslims who inhabited it, carried out by Ramón Berenguer III and his allies, in 1114. Founded in a treaty of 1113 between the Republic of Pisa and the Count of Barcelona, it had the objective of taking the island from the Muslims and preventing the attack and obstruction of the Convoys and ships of the Christian merchants who at that time were sailing in the Mediterranean Sea. Although Mallorca was once again in Muslim power, it served to lay the foundations for the future Catalan naval power and to strengthen business contacts in the Mediterranean.

== See also ==
- Barcelona Royal Shipyard
- Ordinamenta et consuetudo maris
- Catalan cartography
- La Cartografía Mallorquina
- Consulate of the Sea
- Antoni Palau i Dulcet
- Història de la Marina Catalana
- Próspero de Bofarull y Mascaró
- Memorias históricas (Capmany)
- Tartane
- Marine sandglass

== Bibliography ==
- Capmany Montpalau, Antoni. "Ordinances of the naval navies of the Crown of Aragon approved fear the king D. Pedro IV year of MCCLIV". Royal Printing Press, 1787.
- Estrada Ríes, Albert : "The Royal Shipyard of Barcelona in the Middle Ages: institutional organization and shipbuilding for the Crown of Aragon"; 2004
- Hernàndez Cardona, Xavier. Military history of Catalonia. Vol. 2". Rafael Dalmau, 2004. ISBN 84-232-0655-6.
- García y Sanz, Arcadi: "History of the Catalan Navy"; 1977
- Jouve, Jean (1679). Dessins de tous les Bâtiments qui Naviguent sur la Méditerranée [Plans of all ships sailing the Mediterranean Sea] (in French).
- Марквардт, К. Х. (1991). Рангоут, такелаж и паруса судов XVIII века [Bemastung und Takelung von Schiffen das 18.Jahrhunderts] (in Russian). Ленинград: Судостроение. pp. 144–145. ISBN 5-7355-0131-3.
- Михельсон, А.Д. (1865). Объяснение 25000 иностранных слов, вошедших в употребление в русский язык, с означением их корней (in Russian).
- Morro Veny, Guillem: "The Majorcan naval army in 1342"
- Orsi Lázaro, Mario: "The crews of the 1354 navy ships"
- Redondo García, Esther: "On the organization and financing of Pere el Ceremonioso's army against the island of Mallorca (1342)"
- Rodon Oller, Francesc: "Facts of the Catalan Navy"; 1898
- Sans Barrutell, Joan: "Documents concerning the army that in 1351 ordered the King Don Pedro IV of Aragon against Genoese"; 1851
- Serra Puig, Eva: "The galleys of the Generalitat of 1599: effort and destiny of an old ambition"
- Soldani, María Elisa: "The concerns of Catalan sailors regarding death. An analysis of the testamentary dispositions in the XIV and XV centuries "
- Скрягин, Лев Николаевич (1970). "Под сенью парусов Колумба". Техника - молодёжи (in Russian) (11). Archived from the original on 7 January 2014.
- Морской энциклопедический словарь (in Russian). Vol. 3. Санкт-Петербург: Судостроение. 1994. p. 234. ISBN 5-7355-0282-4.
- История отечественного судостроения (in Russian). Vol. 1. Санкт-Петербург: Судостроение. 1994. ISBN 5-7355-0479-7.
