= Consolato del Mare =

Consolato del Mare may refer to:

- Book of the Consulate of the Sea, medieval maritime laws
- Banca Giuratale (Valletta), a building in Malta also called Consolato del Mare
