= Història de la Marina Catalana =

1960 book by Arcadi García Sanz

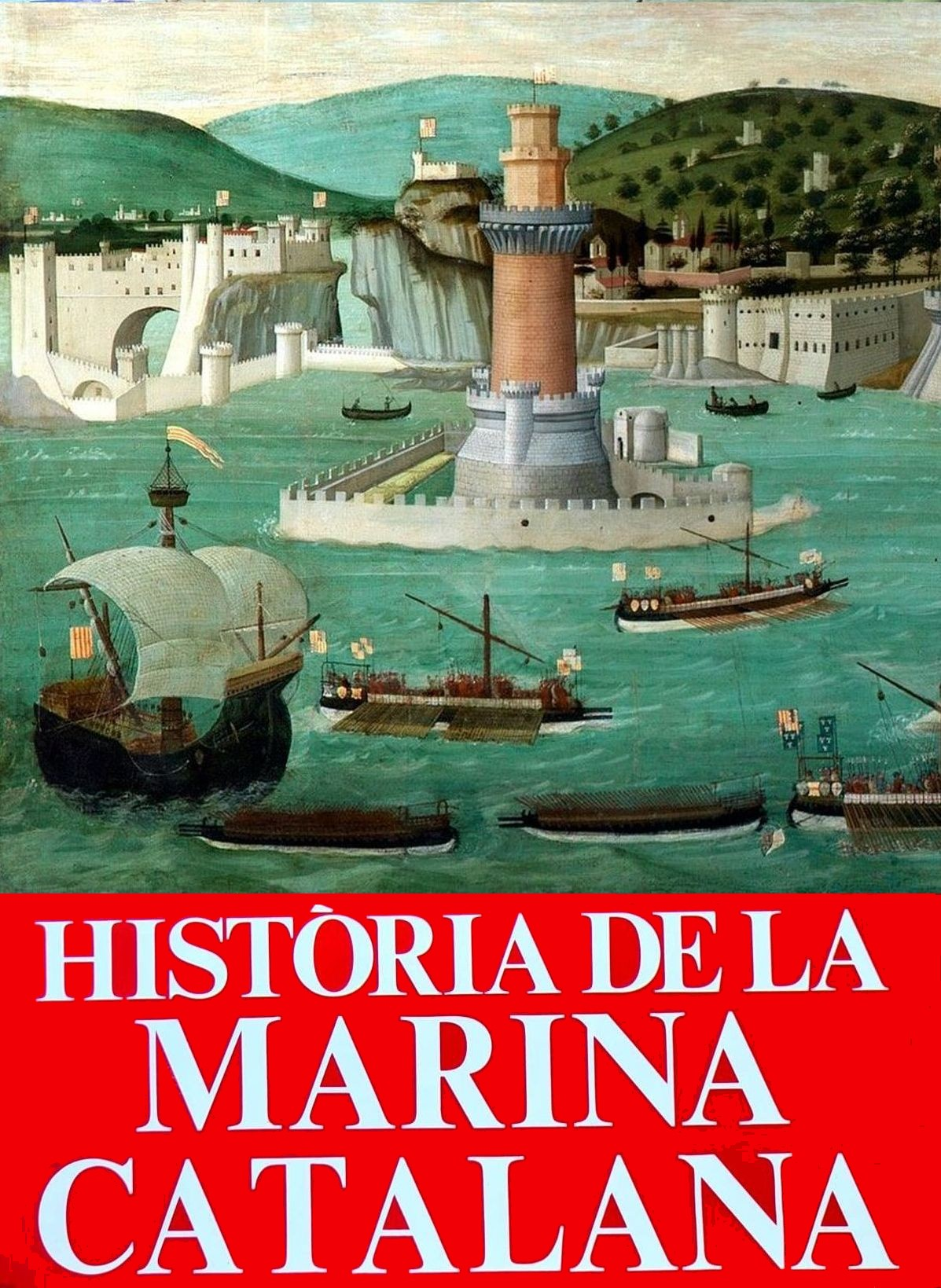
- Cover recreation: Catalan fleet at Naples
- Author: Arcadi Garcia Sanz
- Original title: Història de la Marina Catalana
- Language: Catalan
- Genre: book of essays
- Publisher: Encyclopedia Catalana Aedos
- Publication date: 1960
- Publication place: Spain
- English publication date: N/A
- Media type: Printed book

The History of the Catalan Navy is a book written by Arcadi García Sanz that glosses the Catalan Navy, in trade and war, its exploits and conquests, in a historical compilation that covers from Prehistory to this day. It describes the maritime battles, the Catalan sea consulates, to end by detailing aspects of maritime law, being the author a lawyer.

== Description ==
In addition to explaining, as the title says, the history of the Catalan Navy starts digging in a detailed area especially about the period from the Middle Ages to well into the sixteenth century, detailing the important aspects of the catalan merchant navy, which made Catalonia one of the commercial powers of the Mediterranean.

It is not limited to ships, the organization of maritime transport, trade and Catalan maritime law, political events and the war at sea, but culminates the essay by immersing in the study of the men of the sea, helped by the art and science of maritime navigation accomplished by the Catalans.

== Book Datasheet ==
Prologue by Jose María Martínez-Hidalgo. Collection. "Aedos Catalan Encyclopedia". (Editorial Aedos, Barcelona 1977), 29.5 cm. 449 p. 15 f. which include appendices and indexes. Profuse illustrations in the text, with 17 sheets enlarged outside the text.

== Subsequent influence ==
The work discussed in this article has been profusely cited as a reference in several later works related to nautical issues.

== Content ==
- Chapters 1-2 - Catalan maritime traditions from Prehistory and the origin of the nautical tradition in Catalonia as well as the maritime vocation.
- Chapters 3-4 - Elements of Catalan medieval boats and their dimensions, length, open, strut, arch, equipment.
- Chapter 5 - The nautical organization in Catalonia in the Middle Ages port infrastructure and shipyards, naval weapons, crews of merchant marinas and galleys, organization of flocks: admirals.
- Chapters 6-7 - The medieval navig navigable in Catalonia Art of the sea and use of the sea: Rosa dels Vents, nautical compass, distance traveled to the sea by love, quadrant, Jacob's rod, determination of latitude and longitude, cartography.
- Chapter 8 - Catalan maritime law in the twelfth and thirteenth and fourteenth centuries. Law of Hearts, Maritime Law, Maritime Customs, Maritime Consulates in Barcelona and Valencia, Creation of the Catalan Sea Consulates, writing and content of the Book of the Consulate of the Sea.
- Chapters 10-11 - Seaways of the twelfth, thirteenth and fourteenth centuries. Western Mediterranean Seaway, Eastern Mediterranean Seaway, Atlantic Seaway.
- Chapters 12-13 - Maritime Trade in the Twelfth, Thirteenth, and Fourteenth Centuries: New Systems Introduced, Shipbuilding, Chartering, "Communities," and Order of Use at Sea, Bills of Exchange, Maritime Insurance, Ocean Chartering Model.
- Chapters 14-15 - Naval expedition to Mallorca and other conquests of James I, Final Conquest of the Balearics, Valencia, crusade failure in Palestine,
- Chapter 16 - Peter the Great conquers Sicily: Conquest of Sicily, Battle of Nicotenae, Return to Catalonia.
- Chapters.17-18- Naval struggle against the Franco-Angevin alliance: Battle of Malta, Battle of the Gulf of Naples,
- Chapter 19 - War and Expedition to Sicily and the Bisamti Empire: Naval Battles, from the Treaty of Anagni (1295) to that of Caltabellotta (1302), Expedition of Catalonia to the Empire oriental roman t.
- Chapters 20-21 - Naval confrontation between Catalonia and Genoa in the fourteenth century, conquest of Sardinia, fight with Genoa, fight against the alliance of Castile and Genoa.
- Chapters 22-23 - Nautical Trends in the Early 15th Century and Modern Times Change in the Catalan Maritime orientation, Reorganization of Catalonia at sea in the 15th century, Migration of the "Maritime Leadership" to the Atlantic, Ships, Maritime Organization, trade routes in the 15th century, maritime law and trade in the 15th century.
- Chapter 24- The Catalan Navy in the naval balance of the Mediterranean in the 15th century: Military events at sea in the time of Martí l'Humà, The Catalan Navy in the time of the Trastàmara.
- Chapter 25 - Catalan ships from the 16th century onwards: types of ships and boats, boats with Latin sails and square sails, rowing boats.
- Chapter 26 - The ars navigandi in modern Catalan times: determination of the course, calculation of the distance sailed, calculation of latitude and longitude, maps.
- Chapters 27-28 - The Catalan Navy within the Habsburg Empire: Maritime routes, the Catalans and colonial trade, ports, shipbuilding, Regimen Sanitatis, organization of commercial navigation, the navy and Christ on the Cross.
- Chapters 29-30 - Free return to the sea of the Catalans in the eighteenth and nineteenth centuries: Organization of Catalonia from the decrees of new plant, the Catalan navy and the restructuring of the navy in Spain in 18th century, the routes of navigation and freedom of trade with the Indies, shipbuilding, maritime culture, trade and consulates, the pilot studies and the great figures of the Catalan navy in the 18th century.

== See also ==
- Catalan Navy
- Book of the Consulate of the Sea
- Angelino Dulcert
- Portolan chart
- Catalan cartography
- Memorias históricas (Capmany)
- La Cartografía Mallorquina
- Próspero de Bofarull y Mascaró
- Abraham Cresques
- Catalan chart
- Marine sandglass
- Polygraphia
