= Memorias históricas (Capmany) =

MEMORIAS HISTORICAS SOBRE LA MARINA COMERCIO Y ARTES DE LA ANTIGUA CIUDAD DE BARCELONA
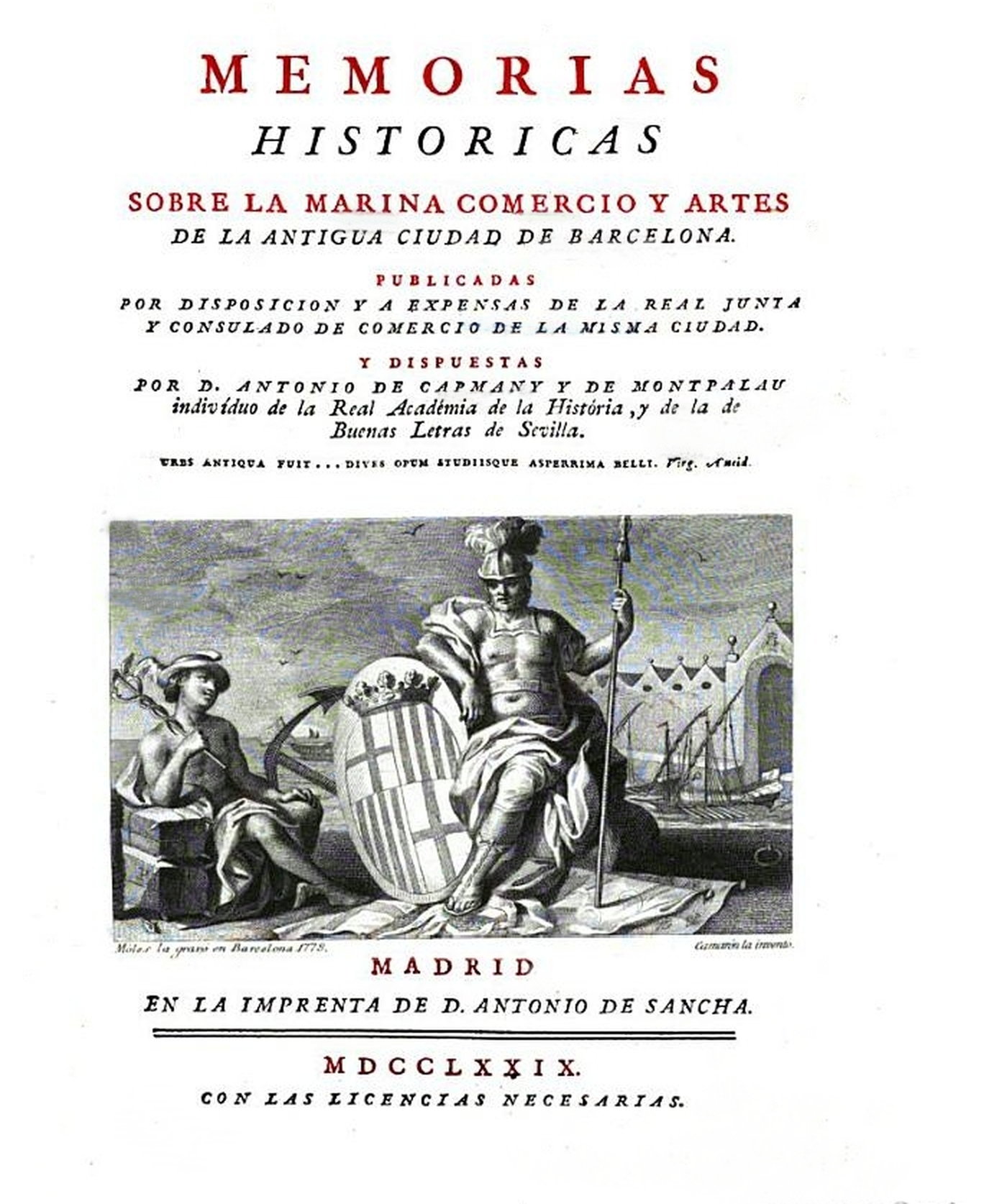
- Home Edition 1779
- Author: Antonio de Capmany y Montpalau
- Original title: Memorias históricas sobre la marina, comercio y artes de la antigua ciudad de Barcelona. Publicadas por disposición ya expensas de la Real Junta y Consulado de Comercio de la misma ciudad y dispuestas por Antonio de Capmany y Montpalau Historical
- Language: Castilian
- Genre: book of essays
- Publisher: Antonio de Sancha editor
- Publication date: 1779-1792
- Publication place: Spain
- English publication date: N/A
- Media type: Paper and parchment

Memorias históricas sobre la marina, comercio y artes de la antigua ciudad de Barcelona. (Historical Records on marine, trade and arts of the ancient city of Barcelona) is a summary paper on the Navy, the trade and the arts of the city of Barcelona, written by the famous Antonio de Capmany y Montpalau.

== Description ==
It's a magnum opus on the former Barcelona economy, noting the aspects that made the city one of the trading powers of the Mediterranean starting in the Middle Ages until well entered into the sixteenth century: its important merchant marine, strong guild structure and industrial productivity all supported by numerous documents from its archives, many of them unpublished until then.

The book was illustrated with cartoons headers and drawn by well-known artists (Camarón, Montaña, etc.) and copper gravures etched mostly by the artist Moles. Antoni Palau comments: "..this basic title contains "an arsenal of documents and first-hand data" that compose altogether a very important work.."

Together with the four volumes of Memorias históricas, there is a fifth volume: "Code of maritime customs of Barcelona" that reproduces the Book of the Consulate of the Sea of Barcelona, forming a collection of five volumes, with an extraordinary historical and documentary value about the history of Catalan Navy.

== Structure of the work ==
Great room, 4 vols.

Vol. 1: 3 leaf, XXIV, 185, 260, 148, VI p;..
Vol. 2: 2 sheet, XVI, 471, XIII, XXX, 124, III p;..
Vol. 3: 2 sheet, XX, 377 p XI;..
Vol. 4: 3 leaf, XXXIV, 418, p 133)...

Followed by:

Vol. V: "Code of the maritime customs of Barcelona" 1 sheet, LXXXI, p 368;.. 1 sheet., 225 p.

== See also ==
- Angelino Dulcert
- Portolan chart
- Catalan cartography
- La Cartografía Mallorquina
- Próspero de Bofarull y Mascaró
- Abraham Cresques
- Consulate of the Sea
- Book of the Consulate of the Sea
