= Ordinamenta et consuetudo maris =

Historic maritime convention

The Ordinamenta et consuetudo maris ("Ordinances and Custom of the Sea") was a convention governing maritime trade promulgated at Trani in 1063: "the oldest surviving maritime law code of the Latin West".

The Ordinamenta is preserved in a Venetian version appended to a copy of the Statuta Firmanorum, the statutes of the commune of Fermo, printed in a single volume at Venice "under the auspices and care, through the diligence, and at the expense of Marcus Marcellus, a citizen of Venice, and a native of Petriolo, a small village in the circle of Fermo, at the press of Nicholaus de Brentis and Alexander de Badanis, the Lord Leonardo Loredano being Doge, A.D. MDVII" (1507). Two copies of this work were preserved in the municipal archives of Fermo and another in the Bibliothèque nationale de France. (Note: One of the copies in Fermo contains additionally an ordinance on maritime average from Ancona. The ordinances are printed on paper and the statutes of Fermo on parchment. The other copy, printed in 1589, is contained entirely on paper and is identical to the French copy.) Probably the Venetian version was a translation made from the original Latin after 1496, when Trani came under Venetian dominion (where it remained until 1509). The printed version appears under a Latin title, with a Latin subtitle (edita per consules civitatis Trani), (Note: "published by the consuls of the city of Trani".) possible both original. A few Latin phrases left untranslated also evidence a work of translation. The text in the archives of Fermo was supplied by their then keeper, Filippo Raffaelle, for a critical edition and English translation in the Black Book of the Admiralty.

The text of the Ordinamenta contains the date anno Domini 1063 and specifies the first indiction. This has been cited as "a strong argument in favour of the authenticity of the ordinances", since the first indiction only coincides with the sixty-third year of a century every three hundred years, but it did with 1063. The text also refers to ‘‘electi consoli in arte de mare’’, which is translated "Consuls elect of the Guild of Navigators" in the Black Book. Neither the translation "guild" nor that of "company" (typical for Latin societas) for the presumed Latin original, ars, is strictly accurate. Nevertheless, the term has been seen as evidence of the existence of a sailors' corporation at Trani in the mid-eleventh century.
