= Próspero de Bofarull y Mascaró =

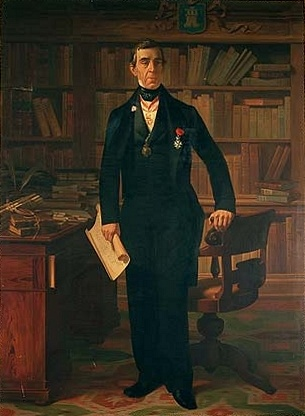
Prospero de Bofarull y Mascaró

Prospero de Bofarull y Mascaró (1777, in Reus – 1859) was a Spanish historian and archivist, archivist and director of the General Archive of the Crown of Aragon between 1814 and 1840 and from 1844 to 1849.

== Biography ==
He has followed studies in Law at the universities of Cervera and Huesca. Moderate liberal and a meticulous person. During the time he was the head of the Archives, he reorganized the Archives and gave them value after a long period of time that they had almost been abandoned.

In 1836 he published Los Condes de Barcelona Vindicados (The Counts of Barcelona vindicated) and Cronología y Genealogía de los Reyes de España Considerados Como Soberanos Independientes de Su Marca (Chronology and Genealogy of the Kings of Spain Considered as sovereign independent of their march) which opened the door to serious research on the Catalan sovereigns, and provided extensive unknown data, but over the years some scholars think they have shown them to be incomplete, yielding to errors in the chronological context. Some scholars as well, they related to his time the disappearance of the last will of King James I, on file 758, and a few crosses (deleting without destroying) appeared in the "Libre del Repartiment del Regne de València" of 1238, now in the General Archive of the Crown of Aragon, but this it is not proven to be his action, for it could have happened in previous periods of time. He died in Barcelona in 1859. His son Manuel de Bofarull y Sartorius (Barcelona, 1816–1892) was also a noted historian and archivist.

== See also ==
- La Cartografía Mallorquina
- Memorias históricas (Capmany)
- Història de la Marina Catalana
- Abraham Cresques
- Arte de navegar
- Antonio de Capmany
- Antoni Palau i Dulcet

== Sources ==
- Martínez Hidalgo, José M. (1984). El Museo Marítimo de Barcelona. Barcelona, Editorial H.M.B., SA. ISBN 84-86054-17-6.
- Tomo 4 (2004). La Gran Enciclopèdia catalana. Barcelona, Edicions 62. ISBN 84-297-5432-6
