= Consulate of the Sea =

Maritime law organization

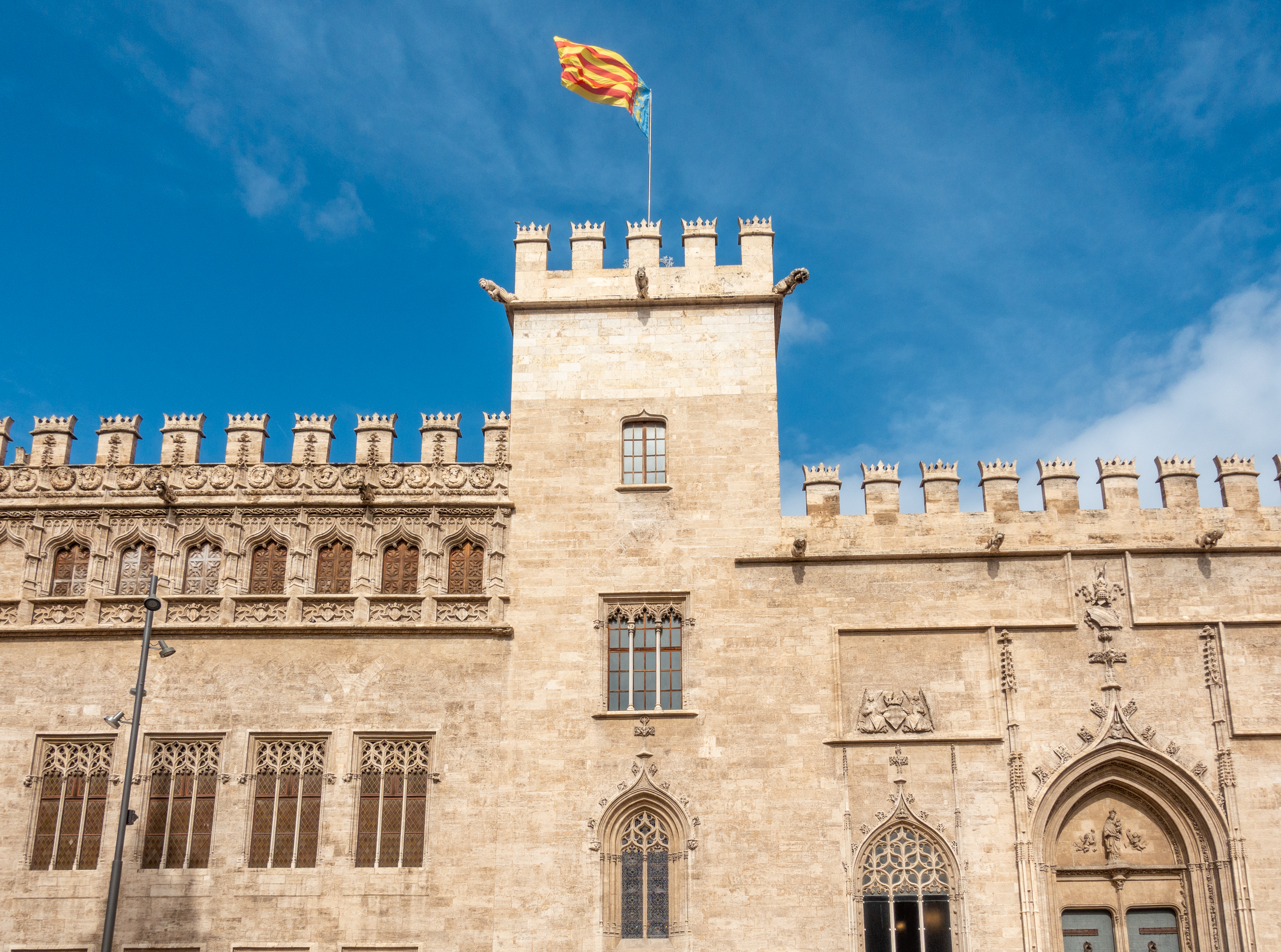
The Llotja de la Seda, seat of the Consulate of the Sea in Valencia since 1498.

The Consulate of the Sea (Catalan: Consolat de mar; pronounced [kunsuˈlad də ˈmaɾ]) was a quasi-judicial body set up in the Crown of Aragon, later to spread throughout the Mediterranean basin, to administer maritime and commercial law. The term may also refer to a celebrated collection of maritime customs and ordinances in Catalan language, also known in English as The Customs of the Sea, compiled over the 14th and 15th centuries and published at Valencia in or before 1494.

In the 21st century, the Catalan term Consolat de mar is today used for a commercial arbitration service operated by the Barcelona Chamber of Commerce, and also for a series of trade-promotion offices operated by the city of Barcelona.

== Medieval institution ==
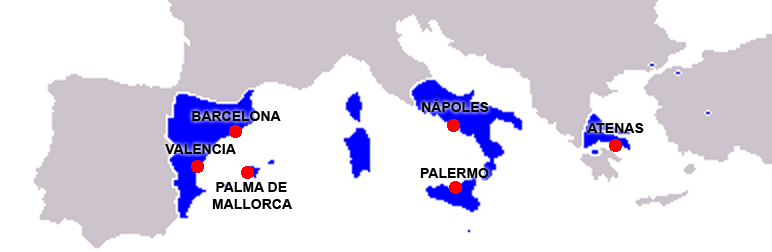
The greatest extent of the territories controlled by the Crown of Aragon, c. 1350

The Catalan institution can be traced to the grant of the Carta Consular to the city of Barcelona by Jaume I of Aragon in 1258. This gave Barcelona merchants the right to settle their commercial disputes without interference from the royal courts: in return, the king received much needed financial support for his wars of expansion. Mercantile Law (ius mercadorium) was becoming established at the same time through much of Europe, and similar bodies had already been established in Messina (first third of the 13th century) and Genoa (1250).

As the territories of the Crown of Aragon expanded, it was customary to establish new Consulates of the Sea in the major ports. One of the earliest was in Valencia (1283), where the charter of Peter III of Aragon makes it clear that disputes are to be settled "according to maritime customs, as these are accepted in Barcelona."

== Book of the Consulate of the Sea ==
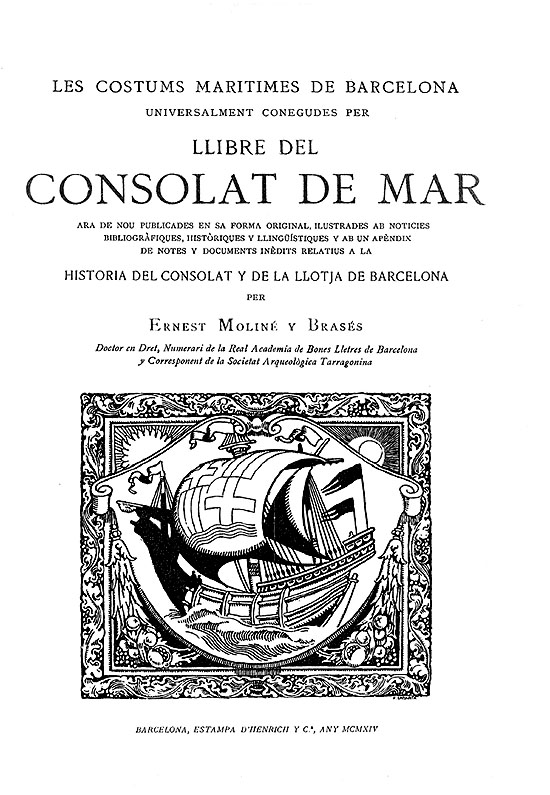
The title page of the 1914 edition of the Book of the Consulate of the Sea, edited by Ernest Moliné y Brasés.

The full title in Catalan is Les costums marítimes de Barcelona universalment conegudes per Llibre del Consolat de mar, or "The maritime customs of Barcelona universally known as the Book of the Consulate of the Sea". The earliest extant printed edition of the work (Barcelona, 1494) is without a title-page or frontispiece, but it is described by the above-mentioned title in the epistle dedicatory prefixed to the table of contents. The only known copy of this edition (as of 1911) is preserved in the Bibliothèque nationale de France in Paris. The epistle dedicatory states that the work is an amended version of the Book of the Consulate of the Sea, compiled by Francis Celelles with the assistance of numerous shipmasters and merchants well versed in maritime affairs.

According to a statement made by Capmany in his Codigo de los costumbras maritimas de Barcelona, published at Madrid in 1791, there was extant to his knowledge an older edition, printed in semi-Gothic characters, which he believed to be of a date prior to 1484.

There are, however, two Catalan manuscripts preserved in the Bibliothèque nationale de France, the earliest of which, being MS. Espagnol 124, contains the two first treatises which are printed in the Book of the Consulate of the Sea of 1494, and which are the most ancient portion of its contents, written in a hand of the 14th century, on paper of that century. The subsequent parts of this manuscript are on paper of the 15th century, but there is no document of a date more recent than 1436. The later of the two manuscripts, being MS. Espagnol 56, is written throughout on paper of the 15th century, and in a hand of that century, and it purports, from a certificate on the face of the last leaf, to have been executed under the superintendence of Peter Thomas, a notary public, and the scribe of the Consulate of the Sea at Barcelona.

The edition of 1494 contains, in the first place, a code of procedure issued by the kings of Aragon for the guidance of the courts of the consuls of the sea, in the second place, a collection of ancient customs of the sea, and thirdly, a body of rules for the government of cruisers of war. A colophon at the end of these ordinances informs the reader that the book commonly called the Book of the Consulate of the Sea ends here; after which there follows a document known by the title of The Acceptations, which purports to record that the previous chapters and ordinances had been approved by the "Roman" people in 1075, and by various princes and peoples in the 12th and 13th centuries: this is generally regarded as of no historical value. The paging of the edition of 1494 ceases with this document, at the end of which is the printer's colophon, reciting that the work was completed on 14 July 1494, at Barcelona, by Pere Posa, priest and printer.

The remainder of the volume consists of what may be regarded as an appendix to the original Book of the Consulate. This appendix contains various maritime ordinances of the kings of Aragon and of the councillors of the city of Barcelona, ranging over a period from 1271 to 1493. It is printed apparently in the same type with the preceding part of the volume. The original Book of the Consulate of the Sea, coupled with this appendix, circulated in Europe under the title, The Consulate of the Sea, and in the 16th century was translated into the Castilian, the Italian, and the French languages. The Italian translation, printed at Venice c. 1549 by Jean Baptista Pedrezano, was the version that obtained the largest circulation in the north of Europe, and led many jurists to suppose the work to have been of Italian origin. In the next century, the work was translated into Dutch by Westerven, and into German by Engelbrecht, and it is also said to have been translated into Latin. An excellent translation into French of The Customs of the Sea, which are the most valuable portion of the Book of the Consulate, was published by Pardessus in the second volume of his Collection des lois maritimes (Paris, 1834), under the title of La Compilation connue sous le nom do consulat de la mer. See introduction, by Sir Travers Twiss, to the Black Book of the Admiralty (London, 1874), which in the appendix to vol. iii, contains his translation of The Customs of the Sea, with the Catalan text.
