= La Cartografía Mallorquina =

Book of essays

The Majorcan cartography
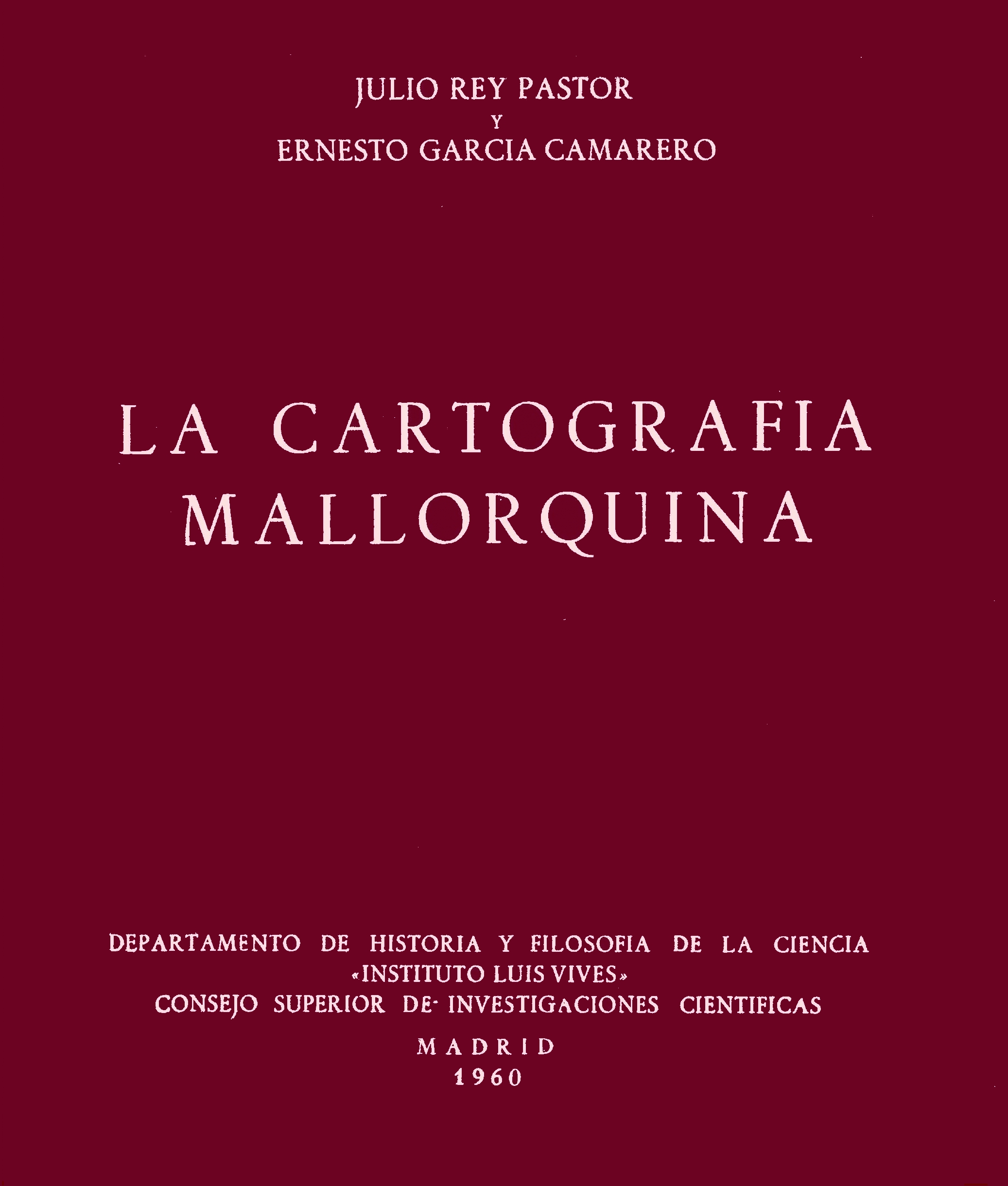
- First edition, 1960
- Author: Julio Rey Pastor & Ernesto García Camarero
- Original title: La Cartografía Mallorquina
- Language: Spanish
- Genre: book of essays
- Publisher: CSIC (Instituto Luis Vives)
- Publication date: 1960
- Publication place: Spain
- English publication date: N/A
- Media type: Printed book & WEB

La Cartografía Mallorquina ( Majorcan Cartography ) is a book of essays on the Majorcan portolans written by Professor Julio Rey Pastor with the collaboration of Ernesto García Camarero. It is a scholarly essay, a key element in the study of portolans, especially those made by Majorcans as half of the book is devoted to the study of more than 400 Majorcan portolans existing worldwide.

== Style of the Majorcan School ==
Rey Pastor before explaining how to identify the works of this school for its unmistakable traits, he says: ".. In the monumental Periplus of the unsurpassed Adolf Erik Nordenskiöld, I saw with pleasant surprise that the most varicoloured parchments, ornamented with fabulous effigies of monarchs and naive legends, written in Catalan with lots of information, physical, biological and political, of each region, they originate in Majorca -in an unknown date-, being designated as "catalan maps"...'

Dr. Julio in his book, gives an explanation of why no Spanish scholar had touched the subject, referring to the unjust appropriation of some portolans by some Italian scholars: "Our geographers, insufficiently armed, they stayed timidly neutral; and the militant vindicator of Spanish science, Dr. Gumersindo Laverde -who had organized a phalanx defending the flag hoisted by the young scholar Menéndez y Pelayo-, they remained silent, for the great scholar had forgotten this chapter of the medieval science "..

Rey Pastor -a great mathematician and lover of the cartography- entered into this profile, in fact cartographers were apart from being artists they had to master mathematics -at least some of them- as the projection of the sphere on a plane it needs them.

Julio Rey Pastor, was able to make the point defending the Catalan authorship of many Majorcan portolans against both, the Portuguese scholars, and some Italian "scholars", and in fact he could not be more impartial, for he was not Catalan, he was from La Rioja.

- From the signature "Petrus Rosselli me fecit ab Majoricarum Insulae". (.."de arte beccaria".. they misinterpreted it as a student of Beccaria)
- From Angelino Dulcert's signature some Italians claimed that Dulcert was "Dalorto" misspelled..

== Influence on Portuguese map makers ==
Rey Pastor says.. "..That Jehuda Cresques (c. 1415) acted as founder and director of a "Palace Cartographic School", (if according to Albuquerque, the Escola de Sagres never existed), this fact was known to historians for over a century, with doubts on which "mestre Jacome" from Majorca corresponded to the "mestre Jacome" contracted by Prince Henry, (although he was the only cartographer with that name).. But it's unforgivable that some scholars arrived to the point (based in a high cartographic ignorance), to attribute the invention of portolans to the school of the Infant, if not to him personally .. but how could that make sense, being the school founded by the emigrated Cresques (about 1400), when at his seventies he was tired of manufacturing planispheres, during half a century, for the insatiable Peter the Ceremonious and for his son, the also map-maniac DON JOAN.. On top of that one should not forget to include the testimony of Pacheco Pereira...:

..Muijos beneficios tem feytos o virtuoso Infante Dom Anrique a estes Reynos de Portugal, por que descubrió a ilha da Madeyra no anno de nosso senhor de mil CCCCXX, e ha mandau pouoar e mandou a Cicilia pellas canas de açuquar, ...; isso mesmo mandou á ilha de Malhorca por um mestre Jacome, mestre de cartas de marear, na qual ilha primeiramente se fezeram as ditas cartas, e com muitas dadiuas e mercés ho ouue nestes Reynos, ho qual as ensinou a fazer áquelles de que os que em nosso tempo viuem, aprendéram...

And he continues.. It's unforgivable as well, that those scholars, could dare to write on the subject without reading João de Barros, which clearly states: "..mándou vir da ilha de Mallorca um mestre Jacome, hornera mui douto na arte de navegar, que fasia e instrumentos náuticos e que Ihe custou muito pelo trazer a este reino para ensinar sua sciencia aos officiaes portuguezes d'aquella mester.."

== See also ==
- Angelino Dulcert
- Portolan chart
- Catalan cartography
- Memorias históricas (Capmany)
- Història de la Marina Catalana
- Próspero de Bofarull y Mascaró
- Abraham Cresques
- Arte de navegar
- Marine sandglass
- Rhumbline grid
