= Black Book of the Admiralty =

Medieval English maritime laws

The Black Book of the Admiralty is a compilation of English admiralty law created over the course of several English monarchs' reigns, including the most important decisions of the High Court of Admiralty. Its starting point is the Rolls of Oléron, which were promulgated in c. 1160 by Eleanor of Aquitaine, although the Black Book is undoubtedly later. The book itself states that the High Court of Admiralty was established during the reign of Edward I (1272–1307), although more recent scholarship places the establishment at c. 1360 during the reign of Edward III. Apart from the Rolls of Oléron, the earliest statute referred to is the Liber memorandorum (1338), of which a separate manuscript copy is available in the archives of the City of London.

The book is written in Old French and its authors change handwriting and tone various times. The earliest surviving manuscript copy dates from c. 1450, and is held in the National Archives. Several printed editions are available: one particularly notable edition is that of Sir Travers Twiss, published in four volumes from 1871 to 1876 and regularly reprinted, which includes several other medieval legal texts as well as the Black Book itself.
