= Antonio de Capmany y Montpalau =

Spanish polygraph (1742–1813)

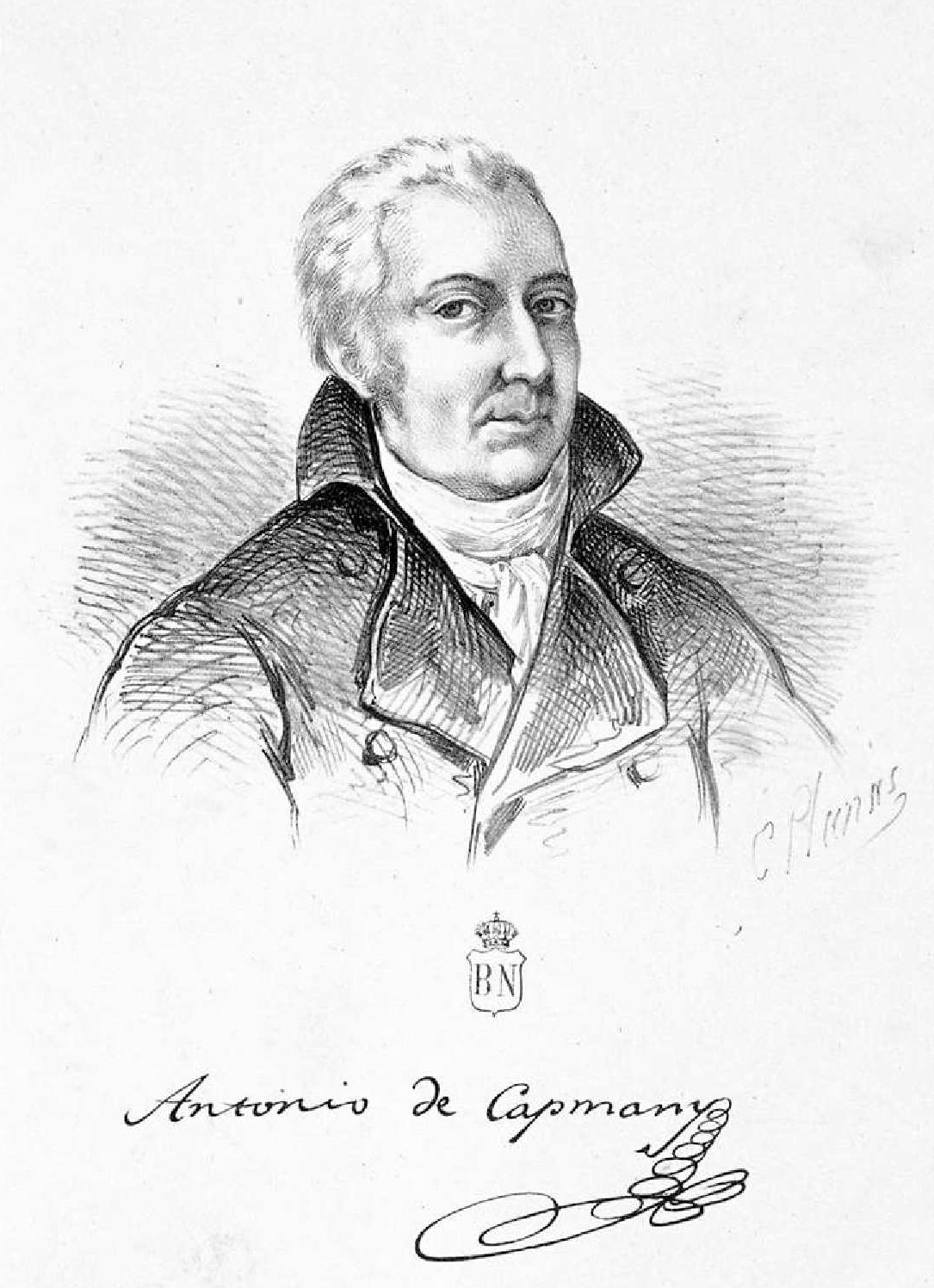
Antonio de Capmany.

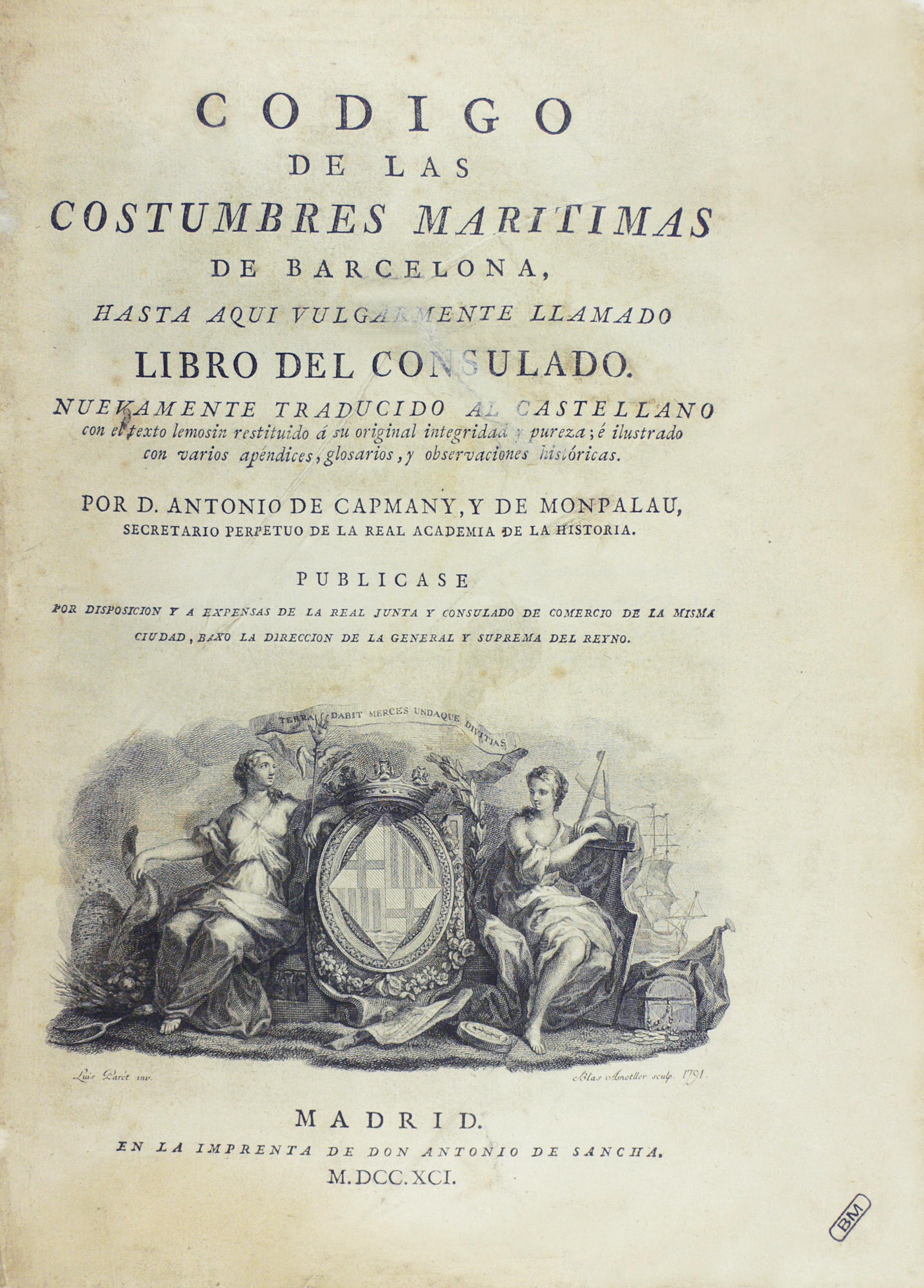
Libro del Consulad, 1791.

Antonio de Capmany y Montpalau (24 November 1742 – Cadis, Andalusia, 14 November 1813) was a Spanish polygraph.

== Life ==
Campany was born at Barcelona, and studied logic and humanities at the Jesuit-run College of Bishops in Barcelona. He entered the army and took part in the 1762 Spanish campaign in Portugal. He retired from the army in 1770, and was subsequently elected secretary of the Royal Academy of History in Madrid.

He was elected deputy for the Principality of Catalonia in the Cortes of Cádiz, one of 51 deputies of Catalonia in that Constituent Assembly.

Capmany died in Cadis on 14 November 1813. His monograph on the history of his birthplace still preserves much of its original value.

A portrait of Antonio de Capmany, by Modesto Texidor, can be found in the Consulate Room at the Llotja School in Barcelona.

== Family ==
He married Gertrudis Marqui in Seville in 1769.

== Works ==
His principal works are:

- Memorias históricas sobre la marina, commercio, y artes de la antigua ciudad de Barcelona (4 vols 1779–1792)
- Teatro histórico-critico de la elocuencia Española (1786)
- Filosofía de la elocuencia (1776)
- Cuestiones críticas sobre varios puntos de historia económica, política, y militar (1807)

== Sources ==
- Martínez Hidalgo, José M. (1984). El Museo Marítimo de Barcelona. Barcelona, Editorial H.M.B., SA. ISBN 84-86054-17-6.
- Tomo 4 (2004). La Gran Enciclopèdia en català. Barcelona, Edicions 62. ISBN 84-297-5432-6
