= Sagres school =

Purported Portuguese "school" of navigation

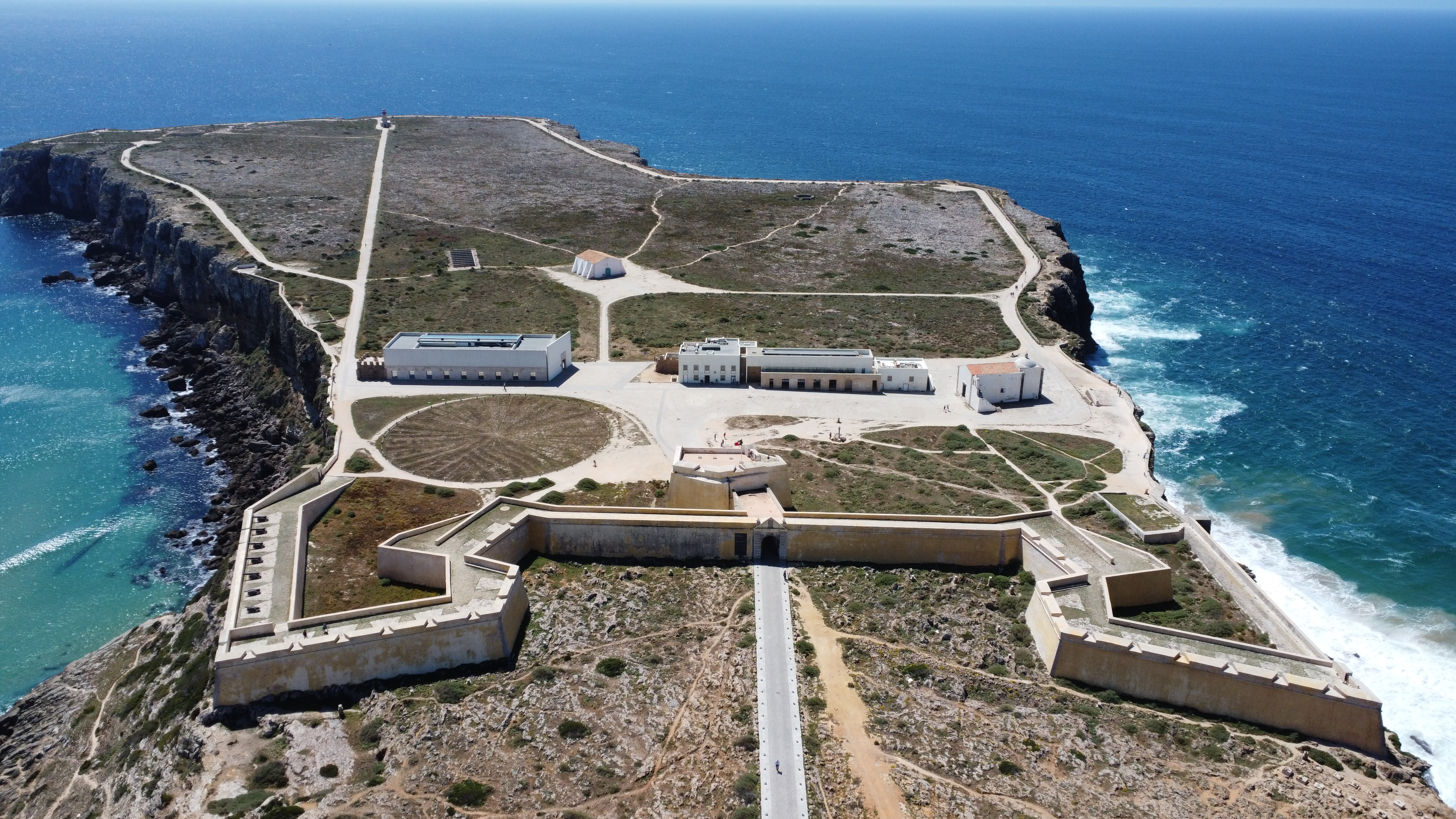
Aerial view of Cape Sagres with the Fortress of Sagres

The School of Sagres (Escola de Sagres in Portuguese), also called Court of Sagres is supposed to have been a group of figures associated with fifteenth century Portuguese navigation, gathered by prince Henry of Portugal in Sagres near Cape St. Vincent, the southwestern end of the Iberian Peninsula, in the Algarve.

Since the nearby port of Lagos was the actual point of departure for numerous expeditions of exploration and colonization along the African coast and Atlantic islands, the existence of a "school" at Sagres has been questioned by some historians. After the death of Prince Henry (1460), the center of Portuguese discoveries shifted to Lisbon.

The first written mention of a "school" at Sagres in English dates from the seventeenth century by Samuel Purchas, although Damião de Gois had already pointed to a similar idea in the sixteenth century. Portuguese and English historians settled on the term and it gained popularity.

== Scholarly debate ==
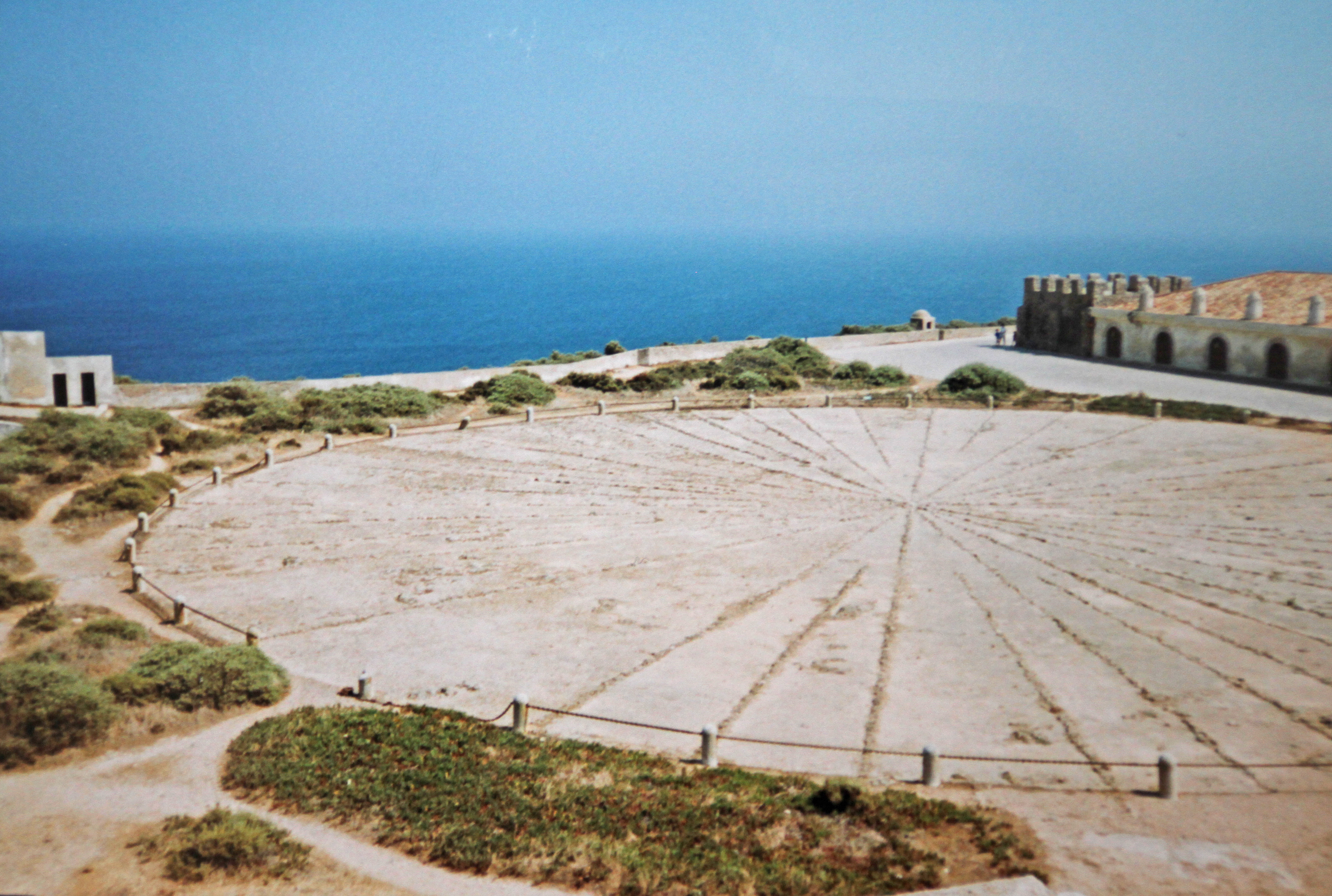
The monumental compass rose at Sagres, discovered in the 17th century.

=== Romantic view ===
In 1894, C. R. Beazly published a biography of Prince Henry stating that he had installed his court in Sagres in 1418, shortly after the capture of Ceuta by the Portuguese. There he would have gathered the best of "science and navigation", built a shipyard and a palace with the first observatory in Portugal, even writing that Sagres represented the modern refounding of "the systematic study of applied science" in Christendom. The diverse religious background of the members of the alleged "school" (Jews, Muslims, Christians), and even a remote connection to the Templars, given the fact that Prince Henry was the commander of the Order of Christ, have served to reinforce a romantic view of the matter.

=== Critical view ===
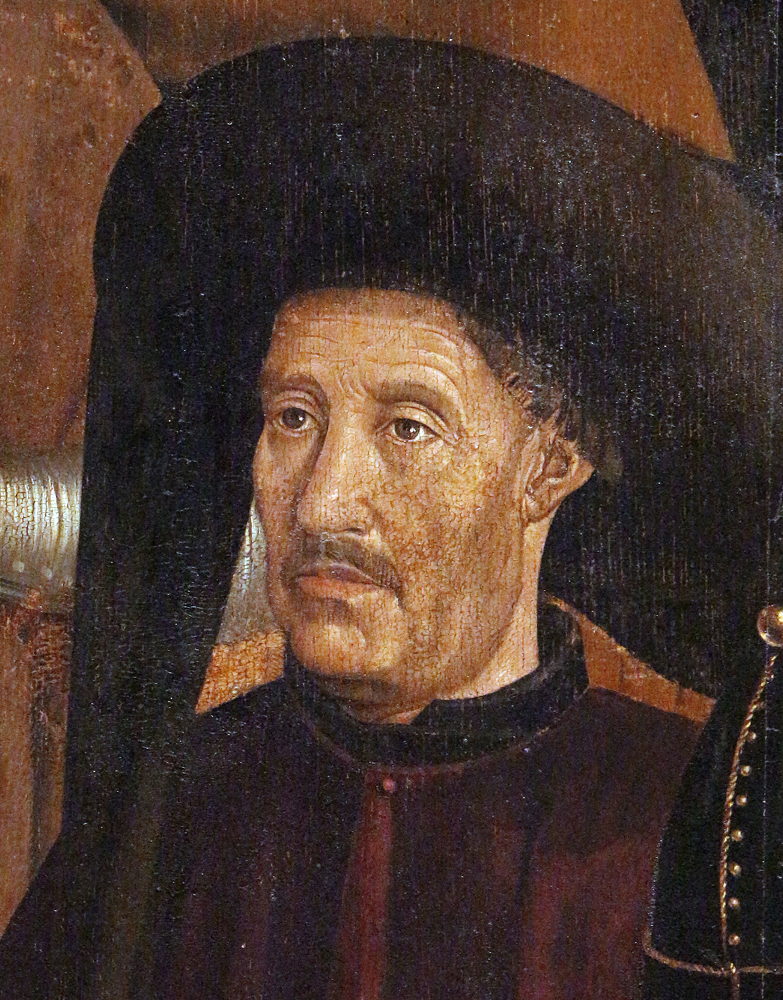
Prince Henry the Navigator

Some have argued that, rather than a nautical school in the modern sense of the word, Sagres was a meeting place for sailors and scientists to exchange information and techniques regarding maps, shipbuilding and organize expeditions. According to a more critical view, the Portuguese learned navigation in a practical way, on the decks of the ships, and lacking archaeological and documentary support for the supposed "school", consider it a myth of Portuguese history.

=== Majorcan influence ===
The Majorcan cartographic school influenced Portuguese practice, as Prince Henry commissioned the Jewish Majorcan Jehuda Cresques to produce portolans. According to the 16th century Portuguese navigator Pacheco Pereira:

Many benefits has the virtuous Infante Dom Henrique done for these realms of Portugal, for he discovered the island of Madeira in the year of Our Lord 1420, and had it settled, and sent to Sicily for sugar‑cane, …; likewise he sent to the island of Mallorca for a master called Jácome, a master of sea charts, on which island such charts were first made; and with many gifts and favours he brought him to these realms, and he taught the craft to those from whom the men living in our time learned.

The 16th century Portuguese chronicler João de Barros states:

He sent for from the island of Mallorca a Master Jácome, a man very learned in the art of navigation, who made nautical instruments, and who cost him dearly to bring to this kingdom so that he might teach his knowledge to the Portuguese practitioners of that craft.

Though some wonder if the master Jacome mentioned in Portuguese sources corresponded to the same master Jacome from Maiorca, no other person from that era is known to have bore the same name.

== First results ==
João Gonçalves Zarco located Porto Santo in 1419 and Madeira in 1420, while Diogo de Silves found the island of Santa Maria in 1427. In 1434 Gil Eanes rounded Cape Bojador. It had taken twelve years to sail beyond two hundred miles separating the Cape Não from Cape Bojador. Beyond that a point begun the "Dark Sea" feared by Arab geographers, due to the difficulty of sailing back north due to contrary winds. A solution to this problem was eventually achieved in the second quarter of the fifteenth century, by means of high sea sailing, returning by a route far away from the coast, dubbed by the Portuguese as Volta do Mar. This breakthrough was achieved through the use of a suitable vessel, the Caravel, used for fishing and characterized for its robustness and shallowness, with a tonnage from 50 to 160 tonnes and 1 to 3 masts with triangular Latin sails.

== See also ==
- Angelino Dulcert
- Catalan chart
- Majorcan cartographic school
- Memorias históricas (Capmany)
- Història de la Marina Catalana
- Abraham Cresques
- Arte de navegar
