= List of Balearics =

This is a list of famous Balearic people (people from the Balearic Islands, one of the Autonomous Communities of Spain).

- Álex Abrines (born 1993), basketball player
- Antoni Maria Alcover i Sureda (1862–1932), linguist and folk tale writer
- Simón Andreu (born 1941), actor
- Miquel Barceló (born 1957), painter
- Fortunio Bonanova (1895–1969), actor, opera singer
- Maria del Mar Bonet (born 1947), singer
- Nicolas Cotoner (1608–1680), Grand Master of the Knights of St. John
- Raphael Cotoner (1601–1663), Grand Master of the Knights of St. John
- Abraham Cresques (14th century), cartographer
- Jehuda Cresques (14th–15th centuries), cartographer
- DJ Sammy (born 1969), disc-jockey
- Simeon ben Zemah Duran, Rashbatz (1361–1444), rabbinical authority
- Rudy Fernández (basketball) (born 1985), basketball player
- Elena Gómez (born 1985), artistic gymnast
- Joan Horrach (born 1974), cyclist
- Maria de la Pau Janer (born 1966), novelist
- Isabel of Majorca (1337–1403), queen
- James II of Majorca (1243–1311), king
- James III of Majorca (1315–1349), king
- James IV of Majorca (c. 1336–1375), king
- Ramon Llull (1232–1315), writer and philosopher
- Jorge Lorenzo (born 1987), motorcycle racer, 2006 and 2007 250 cc World Champion, 2010 and 2012 MotoGP Champion
- Juan March Ordinas (1880–1962), financier
- Juan Mascaró (1897–1987), Sanskrit translator
- Antonio Maura (1853–1925), prime minister of Spain
- Carlos Moyá (born 1976), tennis player
- Francisco Javier Muñoz (born 1980), Xisco, football player
- Miguel Ángel Nadal (born 1966), football player
- Rafael Nadal (born 1986), tennis player
- Mathieu Orfila (1787–1853), chemist
- Juan José Pérez Hernández (1725–1775), explorer
- Albert Riera (born 1982), footballer
- Carme Riera (born 1948), novelist
- Guillem Sagrera (14th century–1456), architect and sculptor
- Sancho I of Majorca (1276–1324), king
- Junípero Serra (1713–1784), friar, California's colonizer
- Llorenç Serra Ferrer (born 1953), football manager
- Anselm Turmeda (1355–1423), writer
- Llorenç Villalonga i Pons (1897–1980), writer
- Agustí Villaronga (born 1953), filmmaker

== See also ==
- List of Spaniards
