= Gabriel de Vallseca =

Cartographer of the Majorcan school

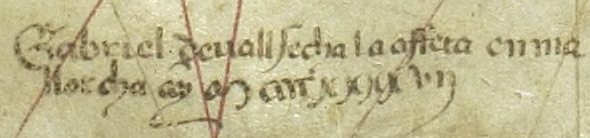
Signature of Gabriel de Vallseca from 1447 portolan chart

Gabriel de Vallseca, also referred to as Gabriel de Valseca and Gabriel de Valsequa (Barcelona, before 1408 - Palma, after 1467) was a cartographer of Jewish descent connected to the Majorcan cartographic school. His most notable map is the portolan of 1439, containing the first depiction of the recently discovered Azores islands.

== Life ==
Gabriel de Vallseca was born in Barcelona to a family of Jewish conversos. He is sometimes said to be the son of Haym ibn Risch (of the Cresques family), who, upon conversion, took the name Juan de Vallsecha. Alternatively, he had Majorcan relatives through his mother or his wife.

By 1433, Vallseca had left Barcelona and was living in Palma, Majorca, where he soon made a name for himself as a master cartographer, instrument-maker and merchant. He lived in the parish of Santa Creu, in the marine and commercial district of the city. He married Floreta Miró and had two sons, Francesc and Joan, both of whom later had run-ins with the Spanish Inquisition for "judaizing", which suggests their father Gabriel may also have been a crypto-Jew. Vallseca wrote out his last will in the city of Majorca in 1467 and died shortly after.

== Works ==
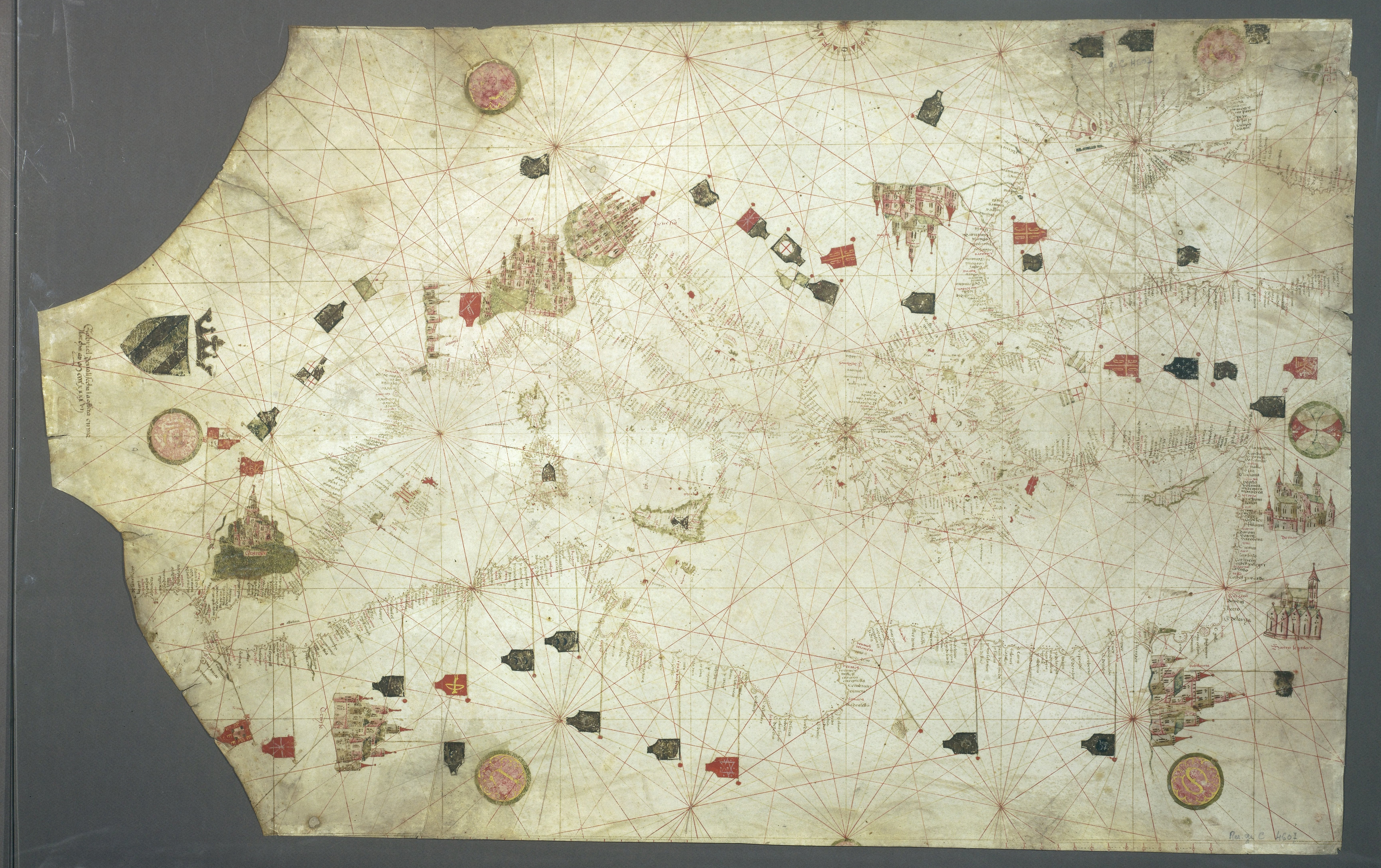
1447 portolan chart of Gabriel de Vallseca (BNF, Paris).

There are three existing portolan charts signed by Gabriel Vallseca

- Map of 1439, at the Museu Marítim de Barcelona (inv. 3236) - partial mappa mundi
- Map of 1447, at the Bibliothèque nationale de France (Rés. Ge. C4607) - Mediterranean only
- Map of 1449 at the Archivio di Stato di Firenze (CN 22) - Mediterranean only

There are also two anonymous maps attributed to him:

- Undated map (est.1440) at Biblioteca Nazionale Centrale di Firenze (portolà 16) - partial mappa mundi
- Undated map (est. 1447) at Bibliothèque nationale de France (Rés. Ge. D 3005) - fragments of the eastern Mediterranean

Although his style conforms to the traditional Majorcan cartographic school, Vallseca incorporated some more contemporary innovations in cartography from Italy, Portugal and elsewhere, most notably from Francesco Beccario (e.g. the homogenization of the scale between the Mediterranean and Atlantic). Gabriel de Vallseca's charts retain some signature Majorcan decorative motifs, such as the wind rose, miniature humans, animals and plants, the Atlas Mountains shaped as a palm, the Alps as a chicken's foot, Bohemia as a horseshoe, the Danube as a chain, the Tagus as a shepherd's crook, the Red Sea colored red, and scattered notes and labels in the Catalan language.

=== 1439 Map ===
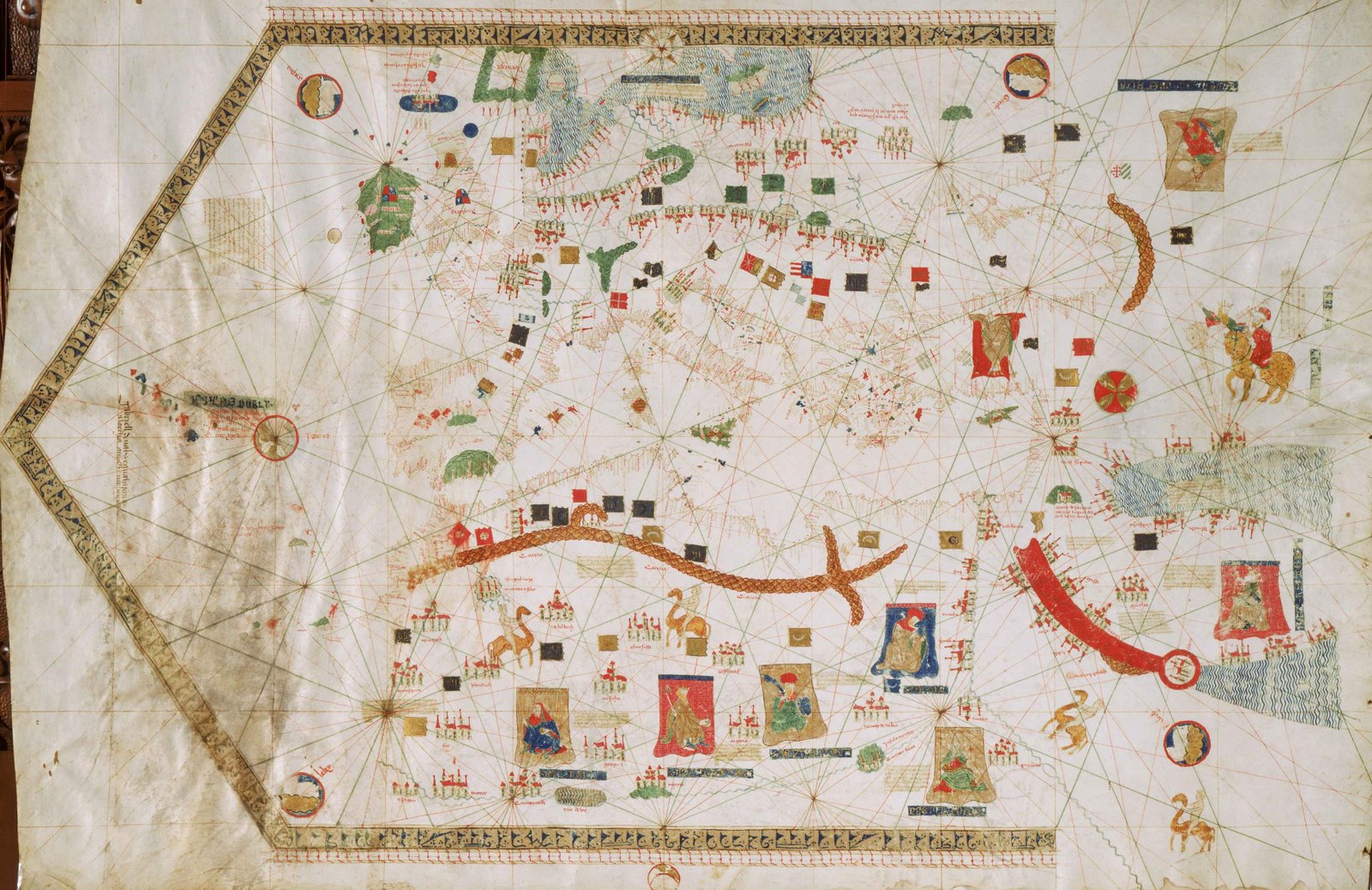
1439 portolan chart of Gabriel de Vallseca (Museu Maritim, Barcelona)

Vallseca's most famous map is the portolan of 1439, particularly for incorporating the very recent discoveries of the captains of the Portuguese Prince Henry the Navigator. Its depiction of the Atlantic Ocean stretches from Scandinavia down to the Rio de Oro and including the Atlantic islands of the Azores, Madeira and Canaries, as well as the imaginary islands of Thule, Brazil and Mam.

The most notable is the depiction of the islands of the Azores (officially discovered in 1431 by Henry's captain Gonçalo Velho Cabral), which although incorrectly spaced, are accurately depicted for the first time as strung out from southeast to northwest.

The 1439 map is signed Gabriell de Valsequa la feta en Malorcha, any MCCC.XXX.VIIII. According to a marginal note on the reverse side, this map was once owned by Amerigo Vespucci, who paid 80 gold ducats for it. (Questa ampia pella di geographia fue pagata da Amerigo Vespuci - LXXX ducati di oro di marco). It is conjectured Vespucci probably acquired it in Florence in the 1480s, and that he might have even have taken it on his 1497-1504 voyages to the New World.

The 1439 Vallseca map was acquired in Florence by the Cardinal Antonio Despuig y Dameto sometime before 1785, and subsequently came into the possession of his heirs, the Majorcan Counts of Montenegro. The map suffered an accident in the winter of 1838/39, when the Count of Montenegro was in the process of showing it to his visitors, Frédéric Chopin and George Sand. A carelessly-placed inkwell tipped onto the map, causing irreparable blots and marring the legibility of some of the labels on the western part of the map.

Most notably, the inkwell accident damaged Vallseca's crucial note pertaining to the discovery of the Azores. The current note reads as follows:

Aquestes isles foram trobades p diego de ??? pelot del rey de portugal an lay MCCCCXX?II (Transl. "These islands were found by Diego de ? pilot of the King of Portugal in the year 14??")

The surname and part of the date are smudged. The earliest reading we have of this portion of the map is by a Majorcan named Pasqual in 1789 who jotted the surname down as "Guullen". It has since been read as Diego de Senill ('the Old' - a hopeful reading in the direction of Gonçalo Velho) and de Sevill or de Sunis, Survis, Sinus, Simis, Sines. The date has been alternatively interpreted MCCCCXXVII (1427) or MCCCCXXXII (1432) or MCCCCXXXVII (1437). In 1943, historian Damião Peres proposed Diogo de Silves and the date as 1427, which is now commonly cited in Portuguese sources.

Vallseca names eight or nine islands of the Azores, which have been hard to read because of the ink accident. One 1841 reading (by the Visconde de Santarem) identifies the names of the eight islands as Ylla de Osels (Ucello, Santa Maria), Ylla de Frydols (São Miguel), Ylla de l'Inferno (Terceira), Guatrilla (São Jorge), de Sperta (Pico), Ylla de ....? (erased, Faial?) and (although not yet officially discovered) the more westerly Ylla de Corp-Marinos (Corvo) and Conigi (Flores) (these last two would only be officially discovered by Diogo de Teive in 1452; Vallseca apparently lifted these last two from the Catalan Atlas of 1375). Other readings decipher "deserta" (rather than de Sperta), "jlla bela" (instead of Guatrilla), illa aucells or jlha aurolls (instead of Osels/Uccello), faucols (instead of Frydols) and raio marnos or vegis marins (instead of Corp-Marinos).

In 1910, the Count of Montenegro put the 1439 map up for sale. It was bought by the Catalan Pere Bosc i Oliver, who proceeded to sell it to the Institute of Catalan Studies, which deposited it at the National Library of Catalonia in Barcelona in 1917. It was transferred in 1960 to the Museu Marítim de Barcelona, where it is currently on display.

There is one reproduction of the map, made in 1892 for an exhibition on the 4th centenary of Columbus in Spain, that is currently in the possession of the Naval Museum of Madrid.

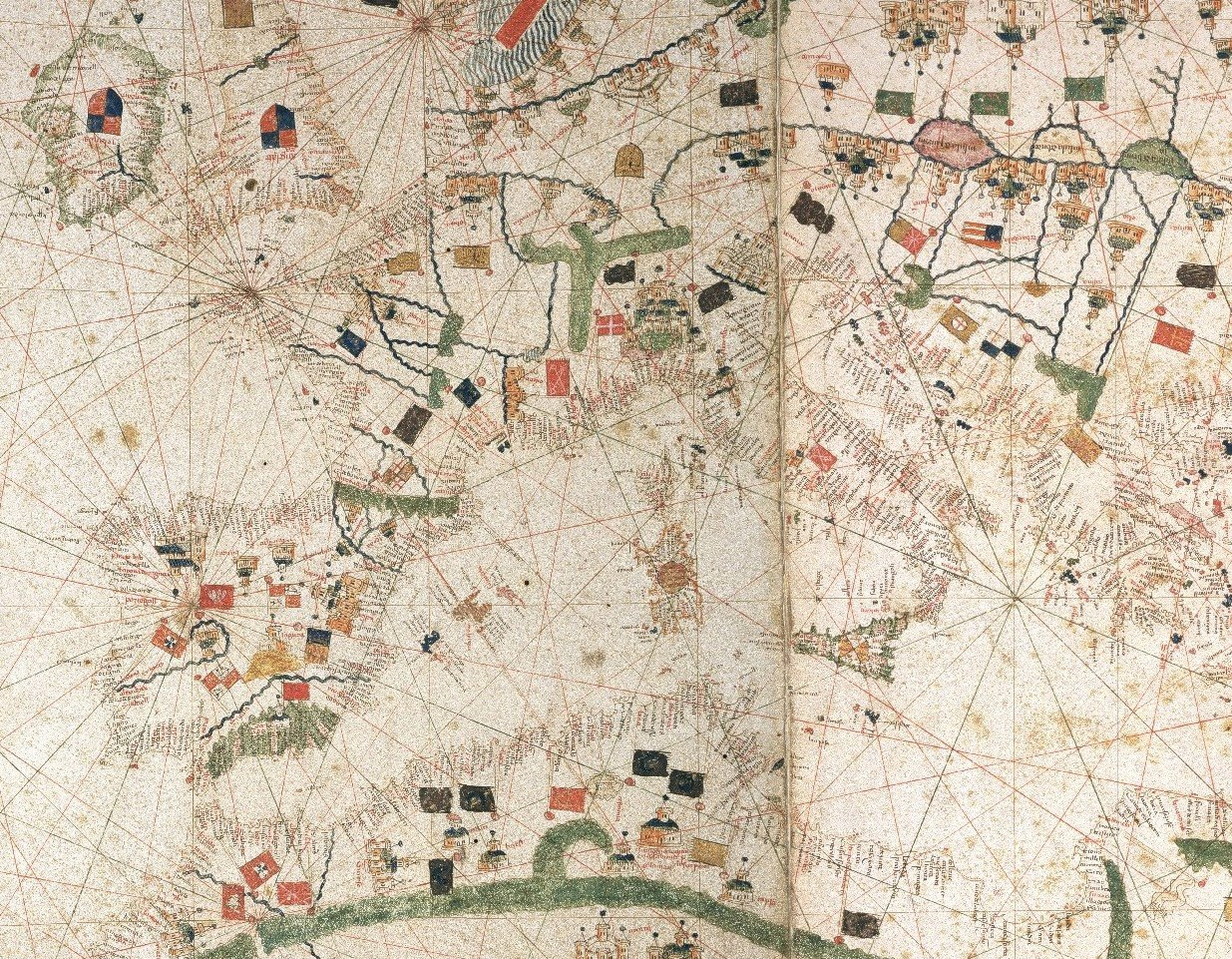
Western portion of anonymous Vallseca chart (c.1440) (Bib. Nat. Cen., Florence)

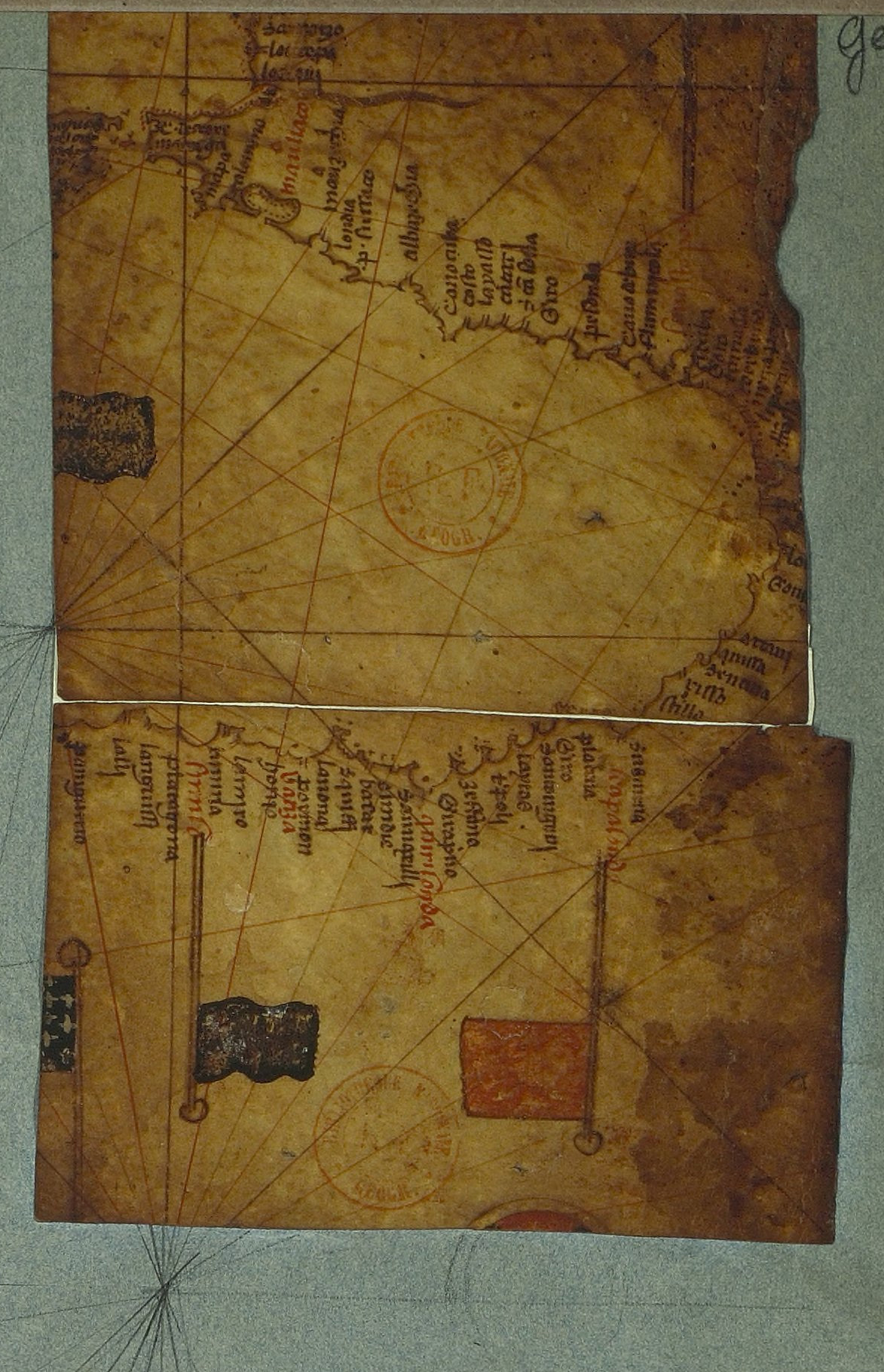
Black Sea fragment of anonymous Vallseca chart, c.1447(BNF, Paris)

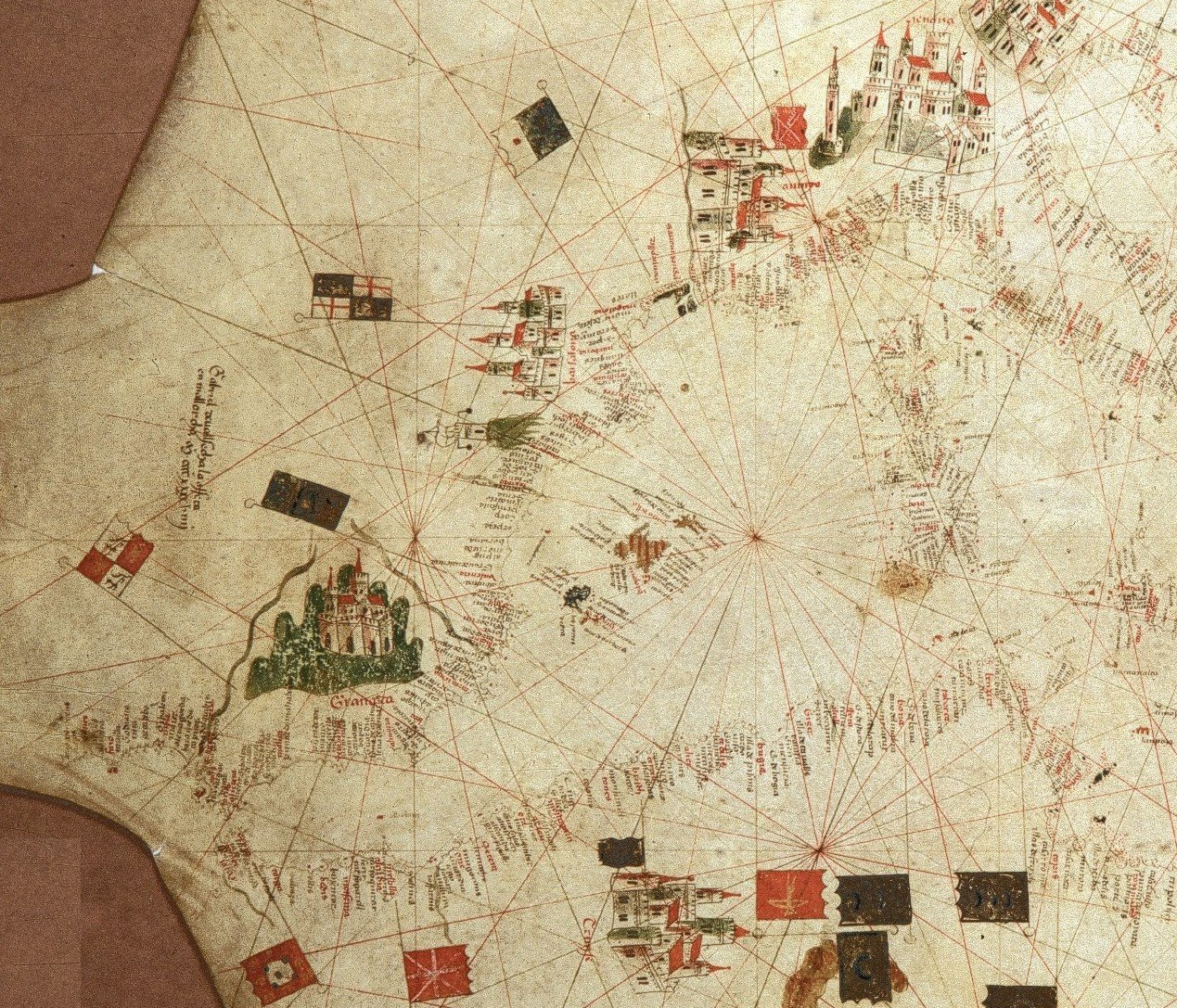
Western portion of 1449 Vallseca chart (Arch. Stat., Florence)

== Sources ==
- C.R. Beazley and E. Prestage, editors (1896–99) The Chronicle of the Discovery and Conquest of Guinea, London: Hakluyt, v.1, v.2
- Cortesão, Armando (1954) A Carta Nautica de 1424, as reprinted in 1975, Esparsos, Coimbra. vol. 3
- D'Avezac, M.A.P. Marquis (1845) Notice des découvertes faites au môyen-age dans l'Océan Atlantique, antérieurement aux grandes explorations portugaises du quinzième siècle, Paris: Fain et Thunot online
- Jordão de Freitas (1937) "As ilhas do arquipélago dos Açores na história da expansão portuguesa", in A. Baião, H. Cidade and M. Múrias, editors, História da Expansão Portuguesa no Mundo, 3 vols.; Lisbon, 1937, vol. 1, pp. 291ff.
- Ginard Bujosa, Antoni (2002) La cartografia mallorquina a Mallorca. Barcelona: JJ. De Olañeta Editor. ISBN 84-9716-145-9.
- Mees, Jules (1901) Histoire de la découverte des îles Açores, et de l'origine de leur dénomination d'îles flamandes. Ghent: Vuylsteke. online
- Novinsky, A.W. (1990) "Papel dos Judeus nos Grandes Descobrimentos", in Revista Brasileira de História. São Paulo, vol. 11 (21), Sep, pp. 65–76.
- Visconde de Santarem (1841) Chronica do Descobrimento e Conquista da Guiné.... pelo Chronista Gomes Eannes de Azurara'
- "Vallseca, Gabriel de" in Miquel Dolç, editor, Gran Enciclopèdia de Mallorca, vol. 18, Palma: Promomallorca. ISBN 84-86617-44-8.
