= Guillem Soler =

Portolan chart of Guillem Soler, c. 1380 (BNF, Paris)

Guillem Soler (fl. 1380s), sometimes given as Guillelmus Soleri, Guillermo Soler and Guglielmo Soleri, was a Majorcan cartographer of the 14th century.

== Life and work ==
Little is known of Guillem Soler. Documents establish his existence in Majorca in 1368, and that he was dead before 1402. Historians once believed him to be an Italian named "Guglielmo Soleri" who worked in Majorca, but has since been more confidently identified as probably of Catalan origin. Majorcan documents identify him as "Guillermi Solerii", citizen of Majorca, master instrument-maker and mapmaker (bruixoler).

Guillem Soler was one of the few non-Jews of the Majorcan cartographic school. A letter of 1387 by King John I of Aragon, written shortly after the death of the great Majorcan cartographer Abraham Cresques, seems to refer to Guillem Soler as a "Christian master" of "similar skill", capable of completing one of Cresques's unfinished maps (uncertain which).

Guillem Soler is the author of two significant portolan charts.

- c. 1380 portolan, undated but signed "Guillmus Soleri civis maioricaru me fecit". This is currently held (Res. Ge. B. 1131) by the Bibliothèque nationale de France in Paris, France.
- 1385 portolan, dated and signed "Gujllmo soleij ciujs Maoicaru me fecit Año A nt, dñj Mccclxx.v", held (CN.3) by the Archivio di Stato di Firenze, in Florence, Italy.

Both are "normal portolan" charts, covering usual range (Mediterranean, Black Sea, Atlantic coast), but contain some stylistic differences. The first (1380) is considered quite typical of the Majorcan school, geared to geographical depiction, with plenty of illustrations and inland details (e.g. rivers, heraldic shields, mountain ranges). The latter (1385) portolan seems more reminiscent of the Italian school – that is, more nautically oriented, nearly bereft of illustrations and with very few inland details.

Guillem Soler's c. 1380 (Paris) chart gives probably the first depiction of the royal arms of England as quartered with the royal arms of France (representing the English claims to the French throne in the 14th century).

Guillem Soler is also the possible author of a third piece, a recently discovered fragment (21x31 cm) of a Catalan chart, covering only a portion of the west Mediterranean. It is unsigned and undated, but believed to be prior to the other two known charts. It is privately held.

Guillem Soler is believed to be the father of Majorcan cartographer Joan Soler and through him ancestral to the later mapmakers Rafel Soler (fl. 1430s) and Gabriel Soler (fl.1460s). He might also be the grandfather (through his daughter Margarita) of Rafel Lloret (fl. 1440s).

== Gallery ==
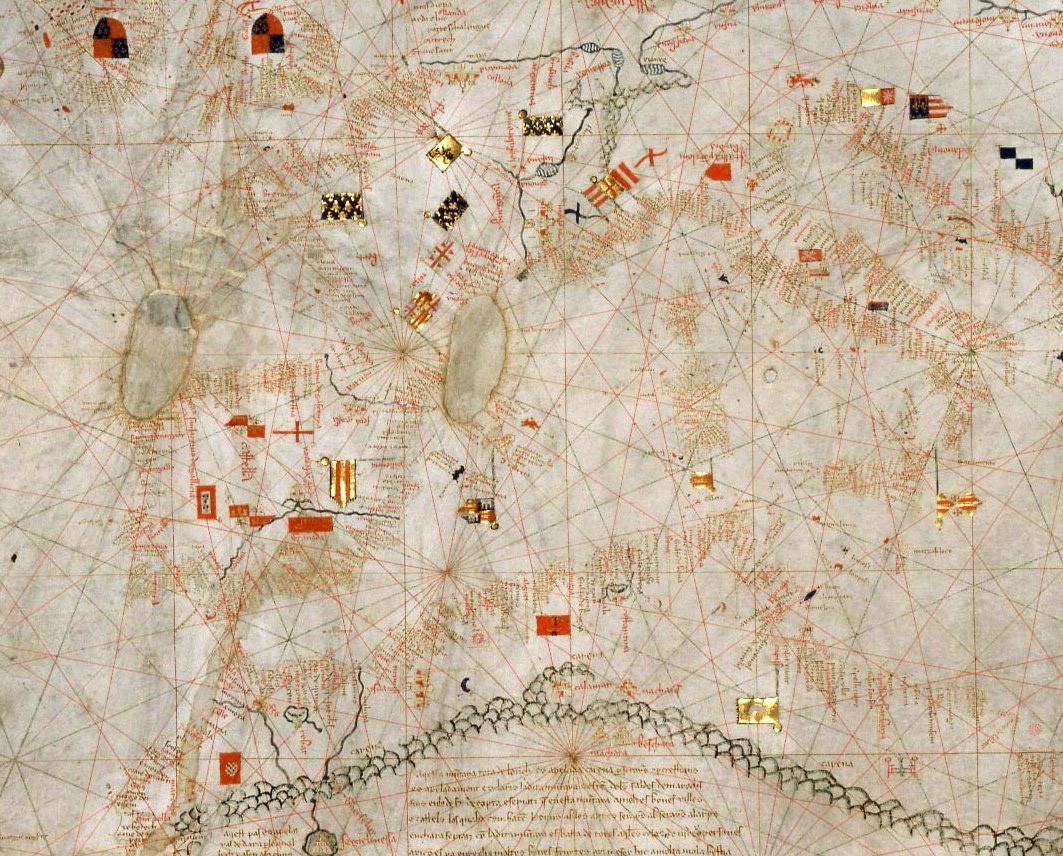
Western Mediterranean detail from Soler's c. 1380 chart (BNF, Paris).

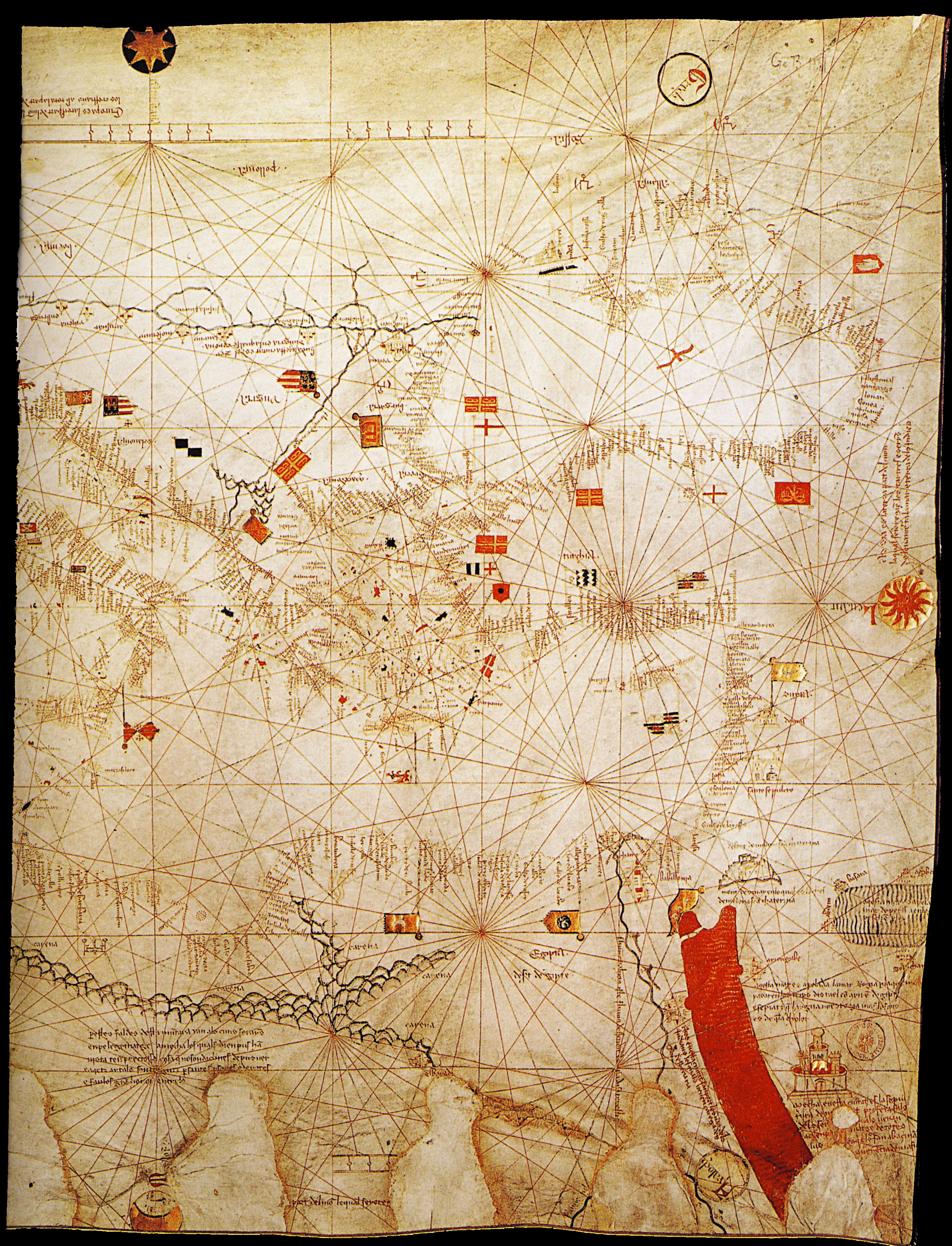
Eastern Mediterranean portion in Soler's c. 1380 chart (BNF, Paris).

Egypt and Red Sea in Soler's c. 1380 chart (BNF, Paris).

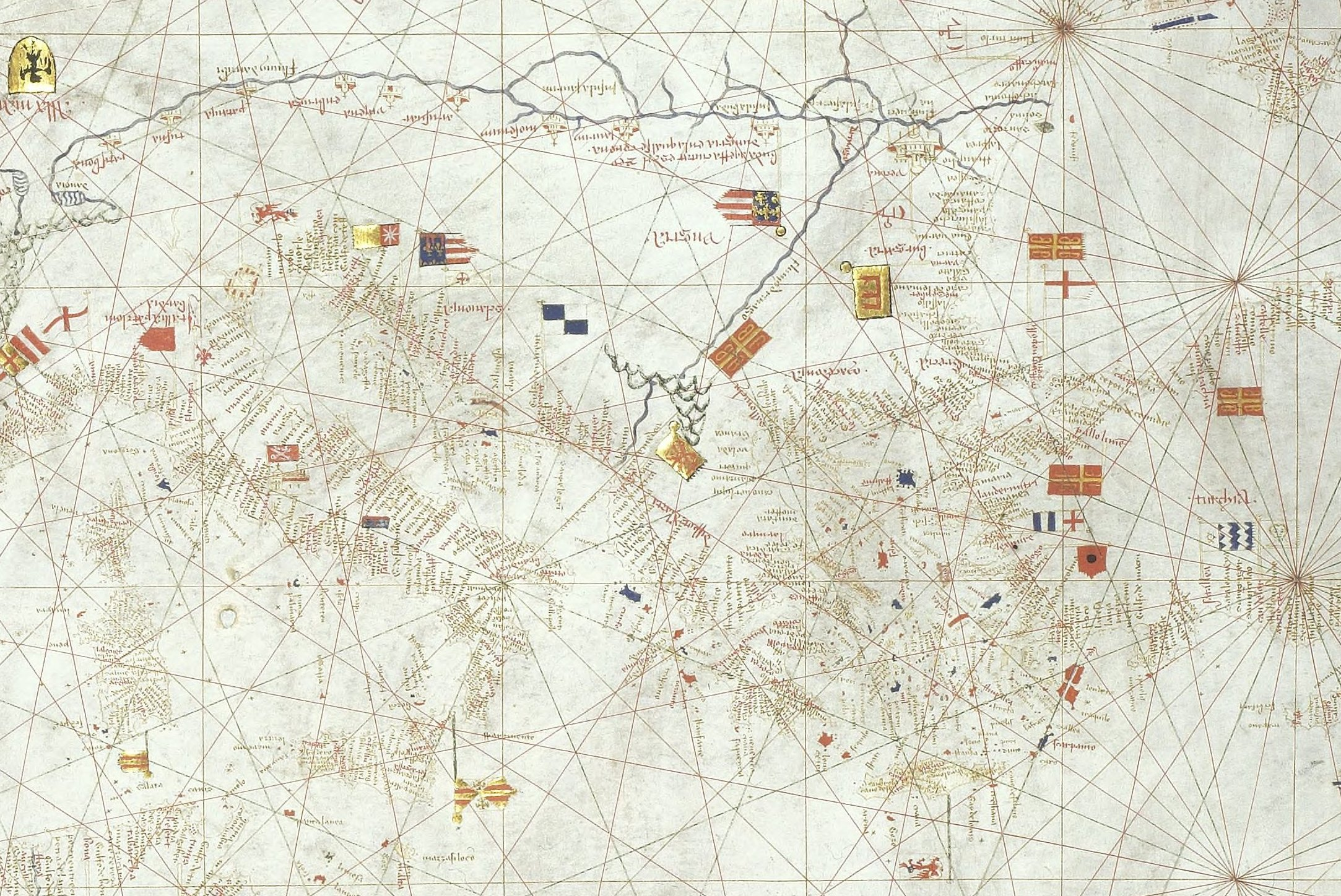
Italy and Greece in Soler's c. 1380 chart (BNF, Paris).

== Sources ==
- Baig i Aleu, M. (2001). "Un nuevo documento sobre Guillem Soler y la cuestion de la cartografia mallorquina" (PDF). Llull. 24 (51): 587–603.
- Beazley, C.R. (1906). The Dawn of Modern Geography. Vol. 3. London: Murray.
- Campbell, T. (1987) "Portolan Charts from the Late Thirteenth Century to 1500". The History of Cartography. Volume 1. Chicago: University of Chicago Press, pp. 371–463. (2011, "Additions, Corrections and Updates", online)
- Campbell, T. (2011) "Complete chronological listing of works assigned to the period pre-1501 (with a note of high quality reproductions and place-name lists)" (online)
- Llopmart, F. (1975). "La cartografia mallorquina del siglo XV. Nuevos hitos y rutas" (PDF). Boletín de la Sociedad Arqueológica Luliana. 34: 438–65.
- Pujades i Bataller, Ramon J. (2007). Les cartes portolanes: la representació medieval d'una mar solcada. Barcelona: Institut Cartogràfic de Catalunya. ISBN 978-8439375760.
