= Catalan chart =

Nautical charts in Catalan

Catalan charts or Catalan portolans are portolan charts in the Catalan language. Portolan charts are a type of medieval and early modern map that focuses on maritime geography and includes a network of rhumb lines. Most medieval portolan charts were made in Italian-speaking cities (mainly Genoa and Venice), with a substantial minority made in Catalan-speaking Majorca. In the 19th century, historians of cartography emphasized the differences of style and content between Italian and Catalan charts, but other authors have nuanced this distinction since then.

== Common properties of all portolan charts ==
A part of the Majorcan map called "Catalan Atlas".

Portolan charts all share the characteristic windrose networks, which emanate out from compass roses located at various points on the map. These better called windrose lines, are generated by observation and the compass, and designated lines of bearing (though not to be confused with modern rhumb lines, meridians or isoazimuthals).

Portolan charts are also characterized by the accuracy of inland features, sometimes for the lines of latitude/longitude and specially for the lack of map projection, for cartometric investigation has revealed that no projection was used in portolans. To understand that the straight lines drawn on the map should be better called "windrose lines", one has to know that they can be loxodromes (modern rhumblines) only if the chart was is on a suitable projection.

As Leo Bagrow states:"..the word ("Rhumbline") is wrongly applied to the sea-charts of this period, since a loxodrome gives an accurate course only when the chart is drawn on a suitable projection. Cartometric investigation has revealed that no projection was used in the early charts, for which we therefore retain the name 'portolan'."

== Differences between Italian and Catalan Portolans ==
Italian portolan charts tend to focus exclusively on coast lines, harbors and the open sea, whereas Catalan ones often shows information about the interior such as rivers. Catalan charts also tend to have richer decoration, with illustrations of cities, monarchs and animals.

== Catalan maps milestones ==
=== Major Catalan maps in history ===
- Catalan Atlas

=== Sites of Major Catalan Schools ===
- Majorca (Majorcan cartographic school)
- Barcelona

=== Major Catalan Mapmakers ===
- Angelino Dulcert
- Abraham Cresques

== See also ==
- Nautical chart
- Països Catalans
- Rhumbline network
- Història de la Marina Catalana
- La Cartografía Mallorquina
