= Jehuda Cresques =

Cartographer from Palma, Majorca

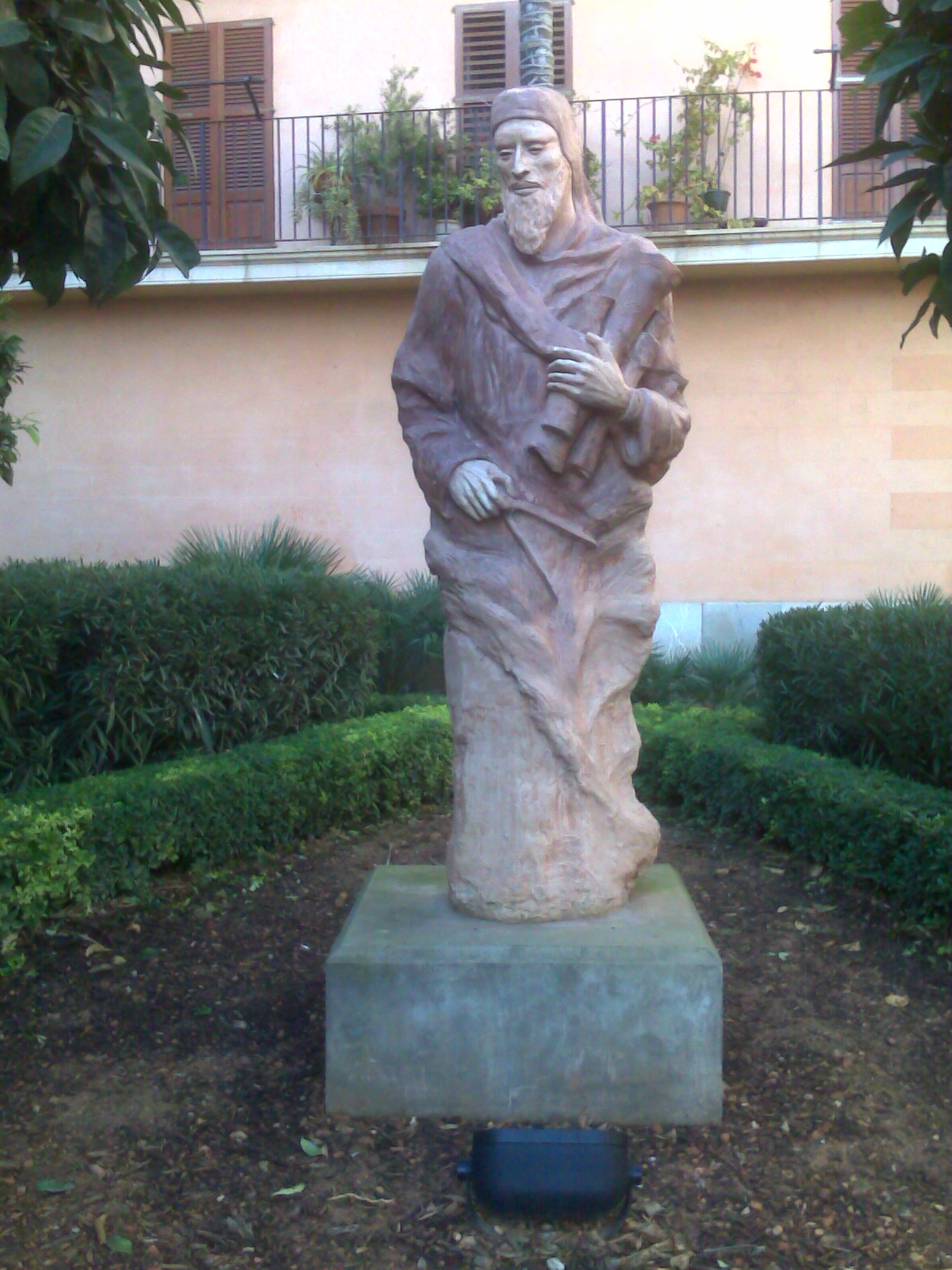
An allegorical Statue of Jehuda Cresques at Palma's "Plaça del Temple"

Jehudà Cresques (Catalan pronunciation: [ʒəuˈða ˈkɾeskəs], 1360-1410), also known as Jafudà Cresques, Jaume Riba, and Cresques lo Juheu ("Cresques the Jew"), was a converso cartographer from Majorca in the early 15th century.

== Biography ==
The son of Cresques Abraham, a famous Jewish cartographer, he was born in Majorca, in the Majorcan-Catalan speaking part of Crown of Aragon, in present-day Spain. Together he and his father were the probable authors of the famous Catalan Atlas of 1375.

Cresques' work was highly sought after. In 1390 John I of Aragon paid 60 livres and 8 sous for one of his maps. After the Aragonese persecutions of 1391 he was forcibly converted to Christianity, at which time he took the name Jaume Riba, Jacobus Ribus, in Latin. He appears to have remained in Majorca for a considerable time and to have become known to the people there as "lo jueu buscoler", the map Jew, or "el jueu de les bruixoles", the compass Jew.

=== 'Mestre Jacome' ===
It has long been believed that Jehuda Cresques is the same person as 'Mestre Jacome', a Majorcan cartographer induced by the Portuguese prince Henry the Navigator to move to Portugal in the 1420s to train Portuguese map-makers in Majorcan-style cartography. 'Jacome of Majorca' was described as the head of Henry's legendary observatory and "school" at Sagres by Samuel Purchas.

The identification of "Mestre Jacome" with Jehuda Cresques" is principally due to the Catalan historian Gonzalo de Reparaz (1930). More recent research argues that Jehuda Cresques was dead by 1410, and "Mestre Jacome" must have been someone else, identity still indeterminate - Majorca had many skilled Jewish cartographers.

== See also ==
- Majorcan cartographic school

== Bibliography ==
- Quadrado, in Boletin de la Real Academia de la Historia, xix.299, 309;
- Hamy, in Bulletin de Géographie, 1891, pp. 218–222;
- Meyer Kayserling, Christopher Columbus, pp. 5–8;
- Jacobs, Story of Geographical Discovery, pp. 60–62.
- Reparaz, Gonzalo de (1930) Mestre Jácome de Mallorca: Cartógrafo do Infante Coimbra (offprint from Biblias journal of the Faculty of Letters of Coimbra).
- Rey Pastor and García Camarero, La Cartografía Mallorquina, 1960, pp. 56–61.
- Riera i Sans, Jaume, "Jafudà Cresques, jueu de Mallorca", in Randa n. 5 (1977) 51-66. (English translation online)
- Riera i Sans, Jaume - Gabriel Llompart, "Jafudà Cresques i Samuel Corcós. Més documents sobre els jueus pintors de cartes de navegar (Mallorca, s. XIV)", in Bolletí de la Societat Arqueològica Lul·liana n. 40 (1984) 341-350. (English translation online)
- www.cresquesproject.net—Translation in English of the works of Riera i Sans and Gabriel Llompart on the Jewish Majorcan mapmakers of the Late Middle Ages. They include very complete biographies of Jafudà Cresques and his father Cresques Abraham.
