= Diogo de Silves =

Portuguese explorer

Diogo de Silves (fl. 15th century) is the presumed name of an obscure Portuguese explorer of the Atlantic who allegedly discovered the Azores islands in 1427.

He is only known from a reference on a chart drawn by the Catalan cartographer, Gabriel de Vallseca of Mallorca, dated 1439. The map, marred by an inkwell accident in 1869, has a note by the Azores archipelago, presumably written by Vallseca, stating:

Aquestes isles foram trobades p diego de ??? pelot del rey de portugal an lany MCCCCXX?II (Transl. "These islands were found by Diego de ??? pilot of the King of Portugal in the year 14??")

The surname and part of the date are smudged. The earliest known reading of this portion of the map is by a Majorcan named Pasqual in 1789 (before the ink accident) who jotted the surname down as "Guullen". It has since been read by other investigators as Diego de Senill ('the Old' - a hopeful reference in the direction of Gonçalo Velho, who officially discovered the Azores in 1431). Others have proposed de Sevill or de Seville or de Sunis, Survis, Sinus, Simis, Sines, Sivils. The date has been variously interpreted as MCCCCXXVII (1427) or MCCCCXXXII (1432) or MCCCCXXXVII (1437).

In 1943, Portuguese historian Damião Peres proposed that only Diogo de Sunis or Diogo de Silves should be entertained as readings from the smudged surname, and opted for Silves simply because Portuguese surnames of that era are usually toponyms and that the town of Silves, in the Algarve, not far from the port of Lagos (where Henry was organizing his expeditions), was not unlikely. He also settled on interpreting the date as 1427. Peres's reading of name and date have since become common in Portuguese sources. The hypothesis has been sufficiently accepted that the Portuguese postal service saw fit to emit a stamp in honor of 'Diogo de Silves' in 1990.

There is no other record or information about Diogo de Silves, whom he worked for or what his objective was. It is often assumed (albeit without corroboration) that Diogo de Silves was a captain in the service of the Portuguese prince Henry the Navigator. If so, he may have been sent out in 1427 as just one of Henry's several expeditions in the 1420s down the West African coast in an attempt to double Cape Bojador, or that he may have been going on a routine trip to Madeira, and it has even been speculated he might have been part of a failed Portuguese attack or slave raid on the Canary Islands. How he ended up in the Azores is uncertain - he may have been blown off course, or may have been gathering intelligence about oceanic winds and currents, perhaps experimenting with one of the earliest volta do mar routes for Henry. Finally, the note that he was the "pilot" retains the possibility that the captain of that expedition was actually someone else (Gonçalo Velho?). The reference to the 'King' and not Henry raises the possibility he may have been in the service of the Admiral of Portugal Pedro de Menezes, 1st Count of Vila Real (then governor of Ceuta) rather than Prince Henry.

The only thing that can be gathered from Vallseca's 1439 map is that he probably only discovered the eastern and possibly central clusters of the Azores archipelago, that he probably did not reach the western islands of Flores and Corvo (although westerly islands are drawn, they are probably fantastical; Vallseca seems to have lifted the names directly from earlier maps, e.g. Catalan Atlas of 1375).
