= Angelino Dulcert =

14th-century Italian-Majorcan cartographer

Angelino Dulcert (fl. 1339), probably the same person known as Angelino de Dalorto (fl. 1320s), and whose real name was probably Angelino de Dulceto or Dulceti, or possibly Angelí Dolcet, was an Italian-Majorcan cartographer.

He is responsible for two notable 14th-century portolan charts, the "Dalorto" chart of 1325 and the "Dulcert" chart of 1339. The latter is the first portolan known to have been produced in Palma, and considered the founding piece of the Majorcan cartographic school. He is also believed to be the author of a third undated and unsigned chart held in London.

== Background ==
Virtually nothing is known of Angelino Dulceti/Dolcet/Dalorto/Dulcert. A common assumption is that he was an Italian of Liguria, who trained in Genoa and subsequently emigrated to the Kingdom of Majorca some time in the 1320s or 1330s.

Angelino 'Dalorto' was once thought connected to the notable Genoese "Dell'Orto" family. The latter were known to be active in the Black Sea and the Asian trade, e.g. in 1340, Pope Benedict XII speaks of receiving a Petraneus da Lorto, former Genoese governor of Caffa and emissary of Uzbeg Khan of the Golden Horde. It was conjectured that Angelino Dalorto moved to Majorca, possibly as a commercial agent for his family's trading house, and took up the name 'Dulcert' as a more Catalan-sounding version of his surname.

However, more recent readings claim the signatures on the maps have been previously misread, that the 'Dalorto' in the 1325 chart should be read as "Dulceto" and the "Dulcert" in the 1339 chart is in fact "Dulceti". This implies Angelino originates from Dulceto, or Dulcedo, a small Italian town in Liguria, a little down the coast from Genoa. This reinforces the common assumption that he was an Italian immigrant who settled in Majorca. However, others have noted the existence of the "Dolcet" surname in earlier Majorcan records.

The identity and nationality of Angelino Dulceti/Dolcet/Dalorto/Dulcert has been a longstanding item of contention between scholars, often attenuated by nationalist sentiments. Scholars who seek to claim Dulcert to be wholly of Catalan nationality have tended to argue that Dalorto and Dulcert are two different men, that the Catalan Dulcert might simply have been "inspired" by the Genoese Dalorto. Pujades (2007), touching only briefly on the controversy, concludes

"It strikes me that our protagonist signed his name indiscriminately as Angellinus de Dulceto or Angellinus Dulceti on Latin legends. Whether this was a Latinisation of the Genoese toponym Dulcedo or that of the Catalan surname Dolcet, is a question I shall leave to those who pursue national glory. As far as cartography is concerned, it makes absolutely no difference where he was born. What interests us is where he trained as a cartographer and where he engaged in his professional career as such, and the toponymy of his charts leaves no room for doubt about the Genoese provenance of his cartographic-toponymic pattern.

== 1325 Dalorto map ==
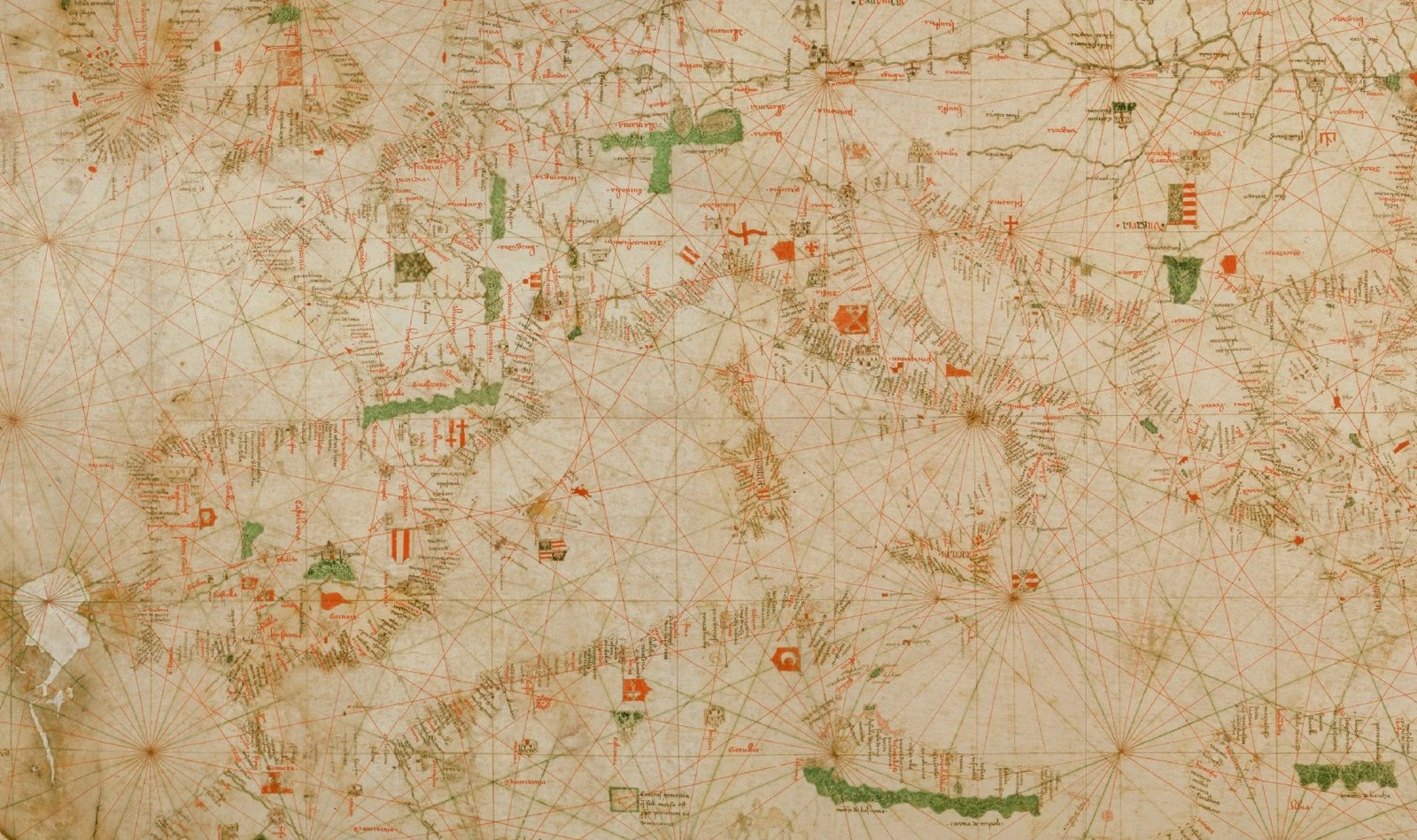
Part of 1325 portolan of Angelino Dalorto

Angelino "Dalorto" is known for a portolan chart commonly dated 1325 (now revised to 1330), privately held by the Prince Corsini collection in Florence. Its signature was traditionally read as "Hoc opus fecit Angelinus de Dalorto ano dñi MCCCXXV de mense martii composuit hoc" (and since re-read as "Angelinus de Dulceto'" and "ano dñi MCCCXXX", thus the revision of the name to "Dulceto" and the year to 1330).

In many ways, the 1325 Dalorto portolan marks a transition point in European portolans, between the Genoese and Majorcan cartographic schools. For the most part, Dalorto follows the restrained coast-focused Italian style, exemplified by the early portolans of his Genoese predecessor Pietro Vesconte, but he also begins moving away from its sparseness by illustrating inland details, such as miniature cities, mountain ranges and rivers, a tendency will flourish in the later Majorcan school. Indeed, some of Dalorto's details here presage the standard Majorcan stylings (e.g. Red Sea colored red, the Atlas Mountains shaped like a palm tree, the chicken-foot Alps, the Danube's "hillocks").

Among its advances in geographic knowledge, the Dalorto map gives a better picture of northern Europe (particularly the Baltic Sea) than its predecessors.

The Dalorto chart is also the first to depict the legendary island of Brasil, as circular disk-shaped island southwest of Ireland. It is denoted by the caption "Insula de montonis siue de brazile" ('isle of sheep' (?) or 'of brasil').

== 1339 Dulcert map ==
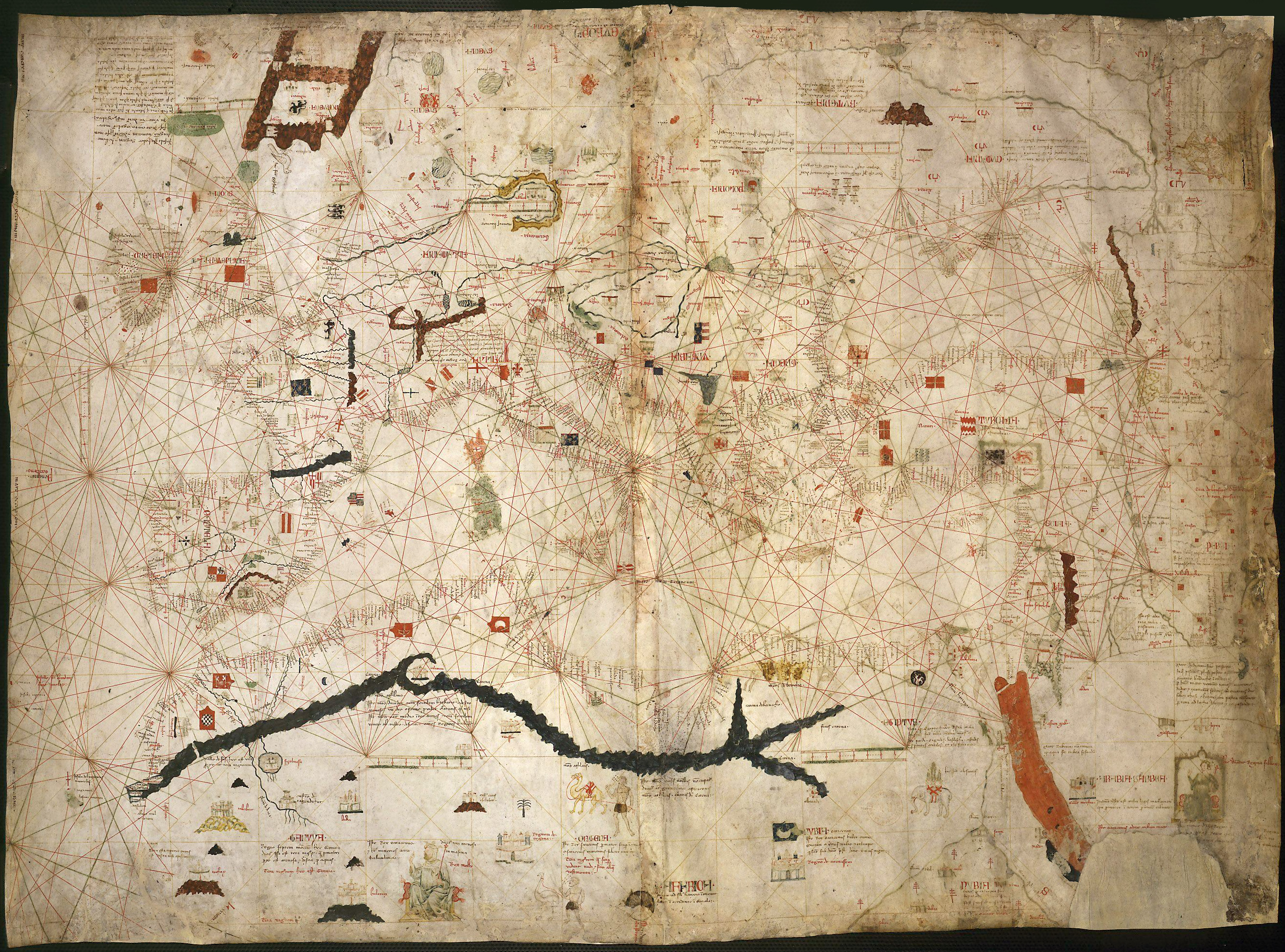
Map of Angelino Dulcert

Angelino "Dulcert" is known for a portolan chart dated 1339 and held by the Bibliotheque Nationale de France in Paris, France (B.696). Its signature reads: "ano MCCCXXXVIIII mense Augusto Angelino Dulcert in civitate Maioricarum composuit". Unlike its predecessor, it is composed not on a single vellum, but on two parchment pages, joined together as a single map, measuring 75 × 102 cm.

Made in Palma, the Dulcert 1339 map is considered the founding piece of the Majorcan cartographic school. Although some of its features were already presaged in the Dalorto map, it goes further in the inland illustrations, in particular including miniature illustrations of people.

In many ways, the Dulcert 1339 map is very similar to the 1325 Dalorto map. On the other hand, the portolan's keys and legends are written in Latin, and it contains features not usually found on Genoese or Venetian portolans.

The 1339 Dulcert map is notable for giving the first modern depiction of the island of Lanzarote, one of the Canary Islands, as Insula de Lanzarotus Marocelus, a reference to the Genoese navigator Lancelotto Malocello, and affixes a Genoese shield to mark the island (a custom which will be retained by future mapmakers).

Dulcert also introduces what seems like the Madeira islands, named here as Capraria and Canaria (legendary names for two of the Fortunate Islands of classical antiquity, as found in, e.g. Ptolemy).

The oldest heraldic representation connected with Macedonia surviving to the present time, or discovered so far, is the banner of Skopje, on the Dulcert 1339 Map, with blazon: Or, double-headed eagle Gules. Above the name of the city of "Scopi" is written "Servia" (Serbia).

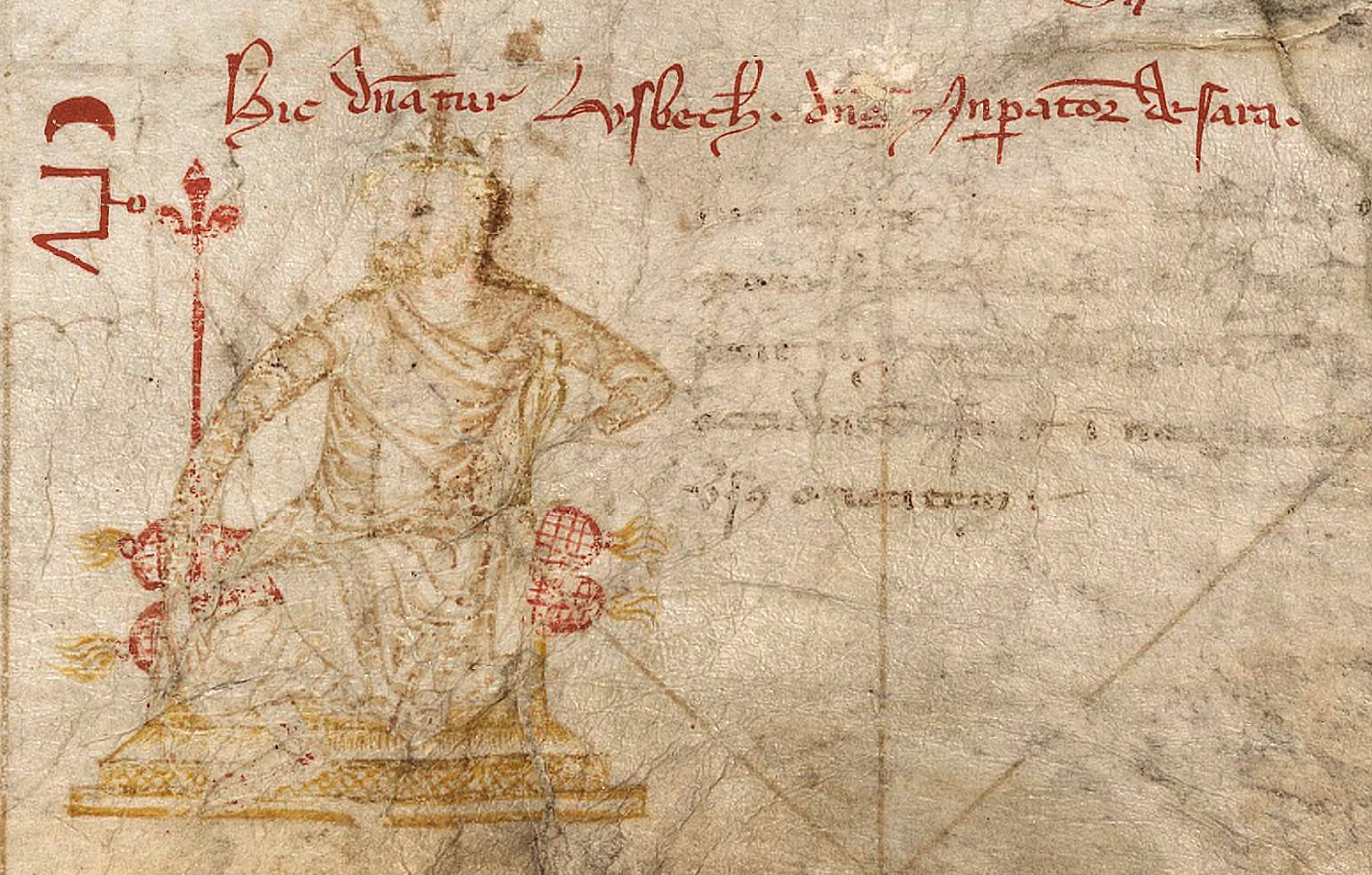
Özbeg Khan, ruler of the Golden Horde, in the 1339 Dulcert map. Legend: Hic dominatur Usbech, dominus imperator de Sara, "Here rules Özbeg, the Emperor of Sara".

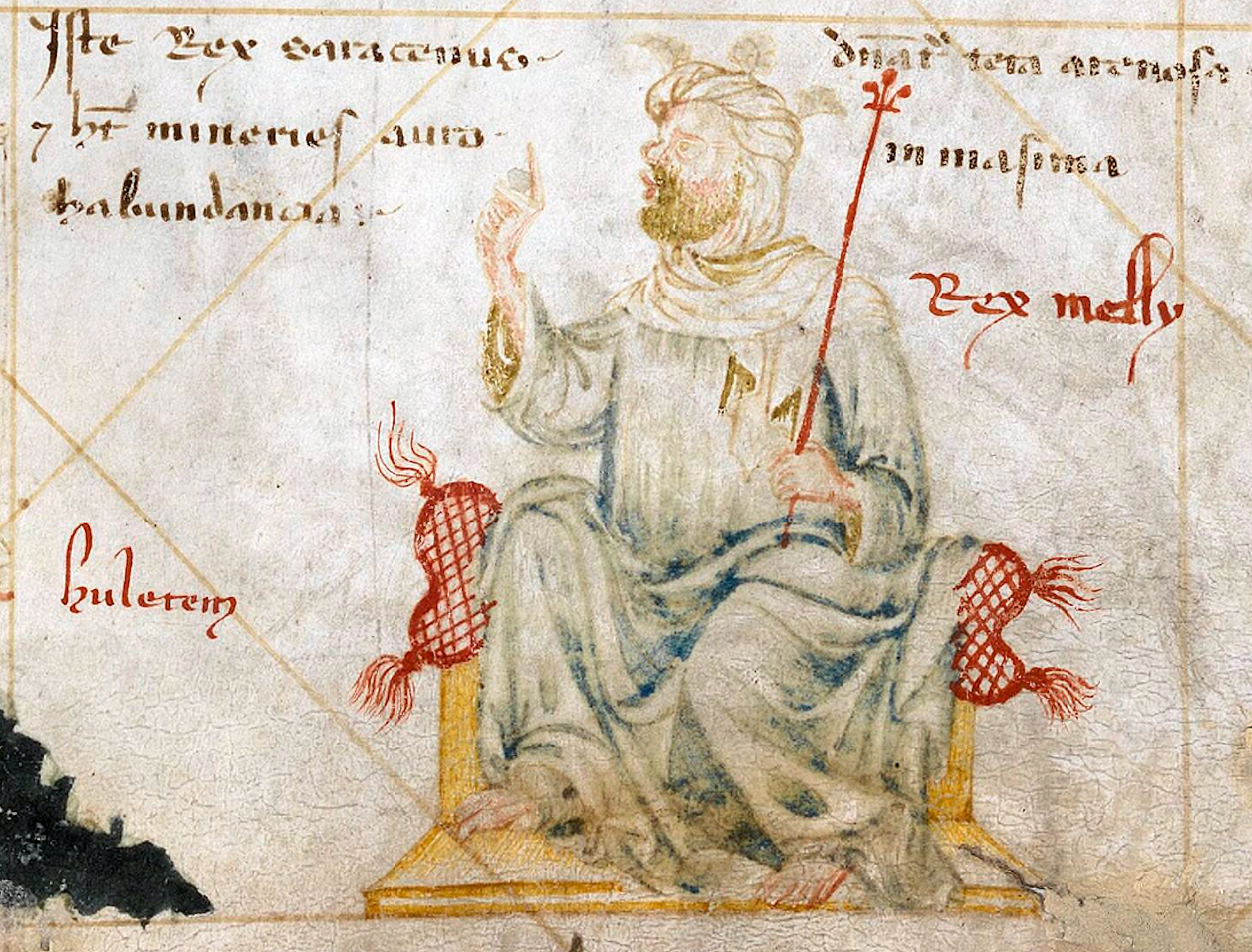
Mansa Moussa, ruler of the Mali Empire, on the map of Angelino Dulcert.

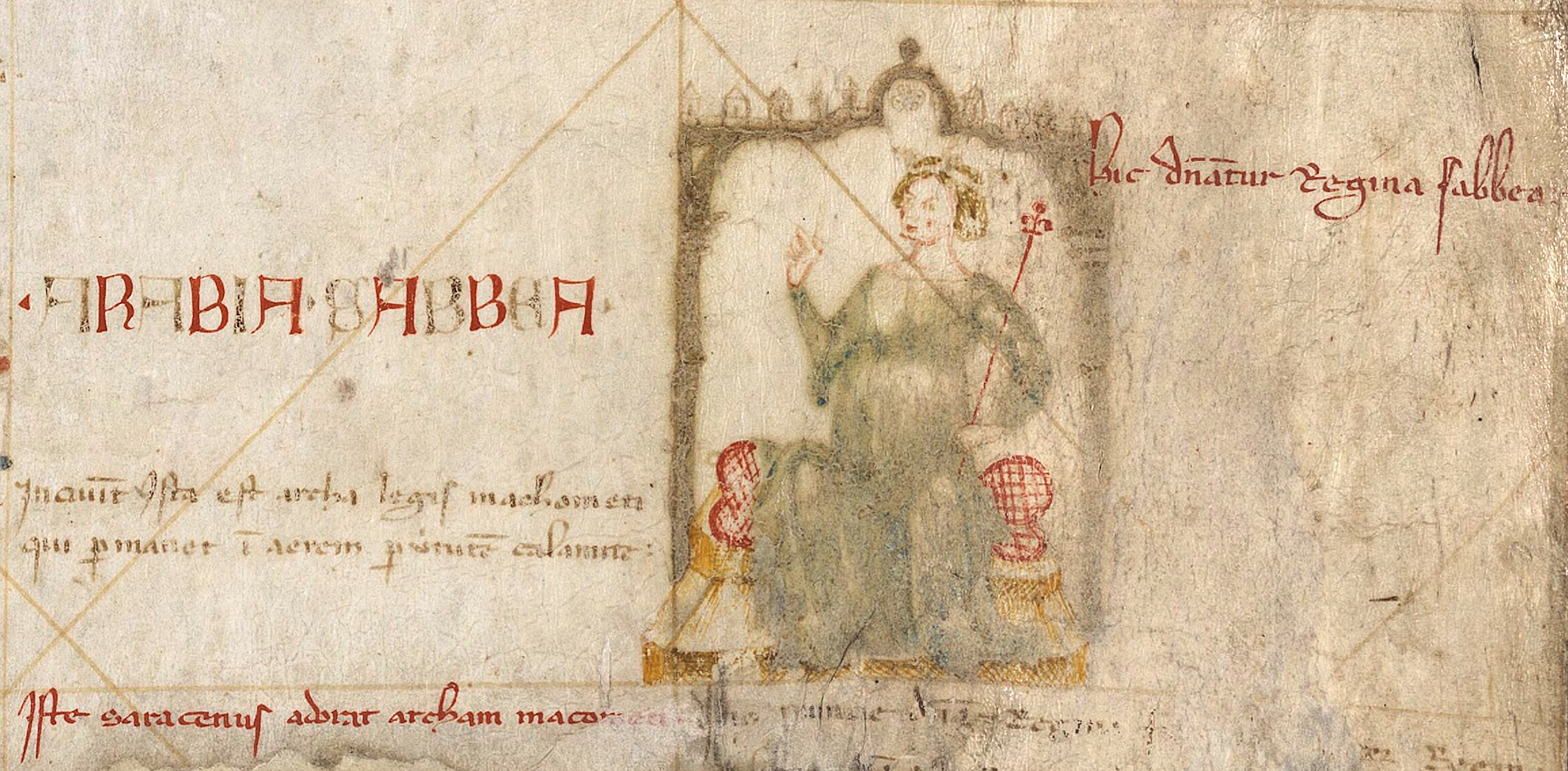
The Queen of Saba, of the Kingdom of Saba

== London map, c. 1340 ==
In the 20th century, a third map has emerged, which is unsigned and which has become commonly attributed to Angelino Dulceti/Dolcet/Dalorto/Dulcert on account of its features. It is held by the British Library in London, UK (Add.MS.25691). It thought to have been composed sometime in the 1340s, although some scholars have suggested it may even precede the Dalorto 1325 map.

== See also ==
- Rhumbline network
- Majorcan cartographic school

== Sources ==
- Beazley, C.R. (1906) The Dawn of Modern Geography. London. vol. 3
- Blázquez, Antonio (1906) "Estudio acerca de la cartografía española en la Edad Media, acompañado de varios mapas", Boletín Real de la Sociedad Geográfica, vol. 48, pp. 190-237
- Campbell, T. (1987) "Portolan Charts from the Late Thirteenth Century to 1500". The History of Cartography. Volume 1. Chicago: University of Chicago Press, pp. 371–463.
- Campbell, T. (2011) "Complete chronological listing of works assigned to the period pre-1501 (with a note of high quality reproductions and place-name lists)" [ online]
- Caraci, G. (1959) Italiani e Catalani nella primitiva cartografia medievale, Rome: Università degli studi.
- Caraci, G (1960). "A Preliminary Reply to Herr Winter". Imago Mundi. 15: 113–14. doi:10.1080/03085696008592185.
- Crone, Gerald Roe (1962). "Origin of Early Marine Charts". The Geographical Journal. 128 (1): 114.
- Fernández Duro, Cesáreo (1888) "Descubrimiento de una carta a marear española del año 1339, su autor Angelino Dulceri ó Dulcert", Boletín de la Real Academia de la Historia, vol. 12 (4), pp. 287–314
- Fernández Duro, Cesáreo (1892) "Los cartógrafos mallorquines: Angelino Dulceti, Jafudá Cresques", Boletín de la Sociedad Geográfica de Madrid, Vol.31, pp. 283–294
- Garcia Camarero, E. (1959) "La Escuela Cartografica de Mallorca", Revista General de Marina, vol. 157, pp. 10-22 online (PDF)
- Hinks. A.R. (1929) The portolan chart of Angellino de Dalorto, MCCCXXV, in the collection of Prince Corsini at Florence, London: Royal Geographical Society.
- Llabrés, Gabriel (1890) "Cartógrafos Mallorquines: ¿Fué mallorquin Angelinus Dulceti?", Boletín de la Sociedad Arqueológica Luliana,, November, p. 347
- Magnaghi, A. (1899) "Il Mappamondo del Genovese Angellinus del Dalorto (1325): Contributo alla storia della cartografia mediovale", Atti del terzo Congresso geografico italiano tenuto in Firenze dal 12 al 17 aprile 1898, vol. 2, Florence: M. Ricci, pp. 506–
- Magnaghi, A (1909). "Sulle origini del portolano normale nel Medio Evo e della Cartografia dell'Europa occidentale". Memorie Geografiche. 4 (8): 115–80.
- Marcel, Gabriel (1887) "Note sur une carte catalane de Dulceri datée de 1339", Comptes rendus des séances de la Société de Géographie. (pp. 28–35) (Offprint published 1887, titled Note sur une carte catalane de Dulceri antérieure à l'Atlas Catalan de 1375, lue à la Société de Géographie de Paris dans la seance du 7 janvier 1887 Paris: Société de géographie.
- Fridtjof Nansen (1911) In Northern Mists; Arctic exploration in early times. New York: F.A. Stokes. vol. 1, vol. 2
- Pujades i Bataller, Ramon J. (2007) Les cartes portolanes: la representació medieval d'una mar solcada. Barcelona.
- Petrus Amat di S. Filippo (1888) "Recenti Ritrovimenti di Carte Nautiche in Parigi in Londra ed in Firenze",Bollettino della Società geografica italiana, Vol. 25, p. 268–
- Winter, Heinrich (1958). "Catalan Portolan Maps and their place in the total view of cartographic development". Imago Mundi. 11: 1–12. doi:10.1080/03085695408592053.
