= Abraham Cresques =

14th-century Jewish cartographer from Mallorca

Cresques Abraham
- A part of the Catalan Atlas by Cresques Abraham
- Born: 1325; Palma, Mallorca
- Died: 1387 (aged 61–62)
- Other names: Eliça, son of Rabbi Abraham
- Occupation: cartographer
- Known for: Catalan Atlas

Cresques Abraham (Catalan pronunciation: [ˈkɾeskəs əβɾəˈam], 1325–1387) was a 14th-century Jewish cartographer from Palma, Mallorca, then part of the Crown of Aragon. In collaboration with his son, Jehuda Cresques, Cresques is credited with the authorship of the celebrated Catalan Atlas of 1375.

== Personal life ==
A Mallorcan Jew, Cresques was a master map-maker and builder of clocks, compasses, and other nautical instruments. He was a leading member of the Majorcan cartographic school.

Cresques Abraham's liturgical Hebrew name was "Elisha son of Rabbi Abraham, son of Rabbi Benaviste, son of Rabbi Elisha". His common name, Cresques Abraham, means that Abraham was his patronym i.e. his father's name; but the order is often flipped in most subsequent literature. His son, Jehuda Cresques, was also a notable cartographer.

== The Catalan Atlas ==
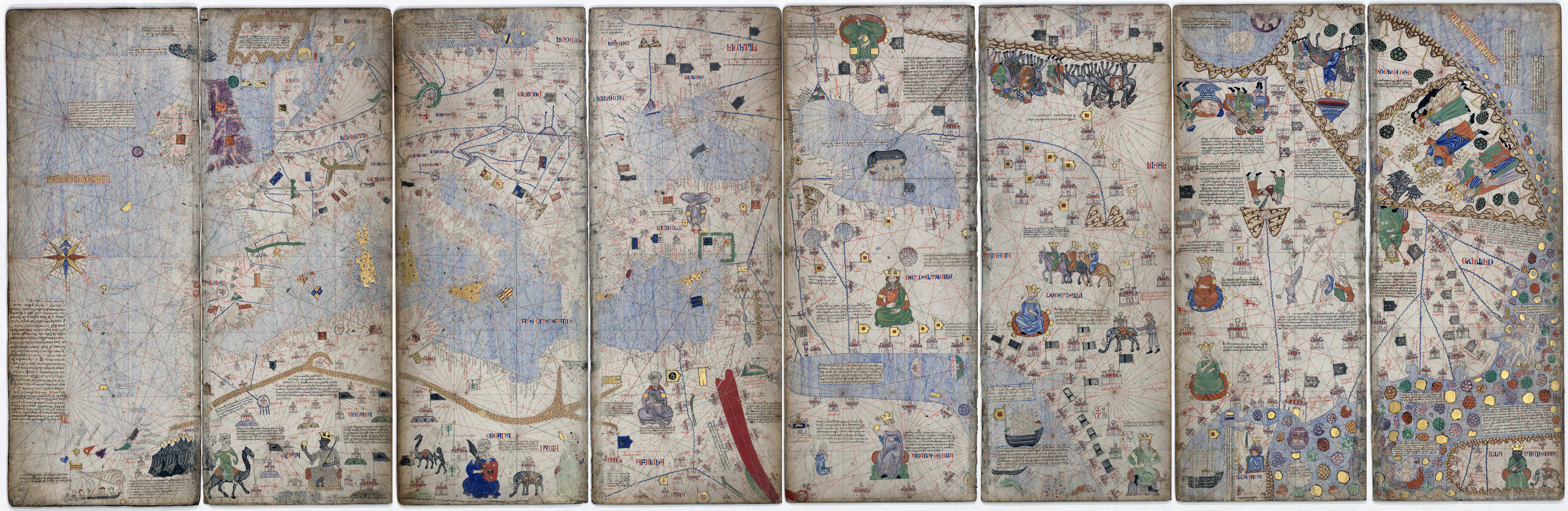
The 8 page montage of the Catalan Atlas

In 1375, Cresques and his son Jehuda received an assignment from Prince John of Aragon, the future John I of Aragon, to make a set of nautical charts which would go beyond the normal geographic range of contemporary portolan charts to cover the East and the West, and everything that, from the Strait [of Gibraltar] leads to the West.

For this job, Cresques and Jehuda were paid 150 Aragonese golden florins, and 60 Mallorcan pounds, respectively, as it is stated in 14th-century documents from the Prince and his father Peter IV of Aragon. Prince John intended to present the chart to his cousin Charles, later to be Charles VI, King of France, as a gift. In that year 1375 Cresques and Jehuda drew the six charts that composed the Catalan Atlas at their house in the Jewish quarter of Palma.

== Works attributed to Cresques ==
The Catalan Atlas of c. 1375 is the only map that has been confidently attributed to Cresques Abraham. Researchers have suggested that five other existing maps might also be attributed to Cresques, Jehuda or some other worker in the Cresques atelier. Like the Catalan Atlas itself, these five maps (four portolan charts, one fragment of a mappa mundi), are unsigned and undated, and their date of composition estimated sometime between 1375 and 1400.

- Catalan Atlas, c. 1375, 6 panels, map from the Atlantic Ocean to China, held at the Bibliothèque Nationale de France in Paris, France (call number MS Espagnol 30)
- Venice chart, c. 1375–1400, portolan chart (missing northern Europe), held at the Biblioteca Marciana in Venice, Italy (call number It.IV,1912)
- Florence chart, c. 1375–1400, portolan chart (west Mediterranean only) held at the National Central Library, Florence, Italy (call number Portolano 22)
- Naples chart, c. 1375–1400, normal portolan chart held at the Biblioteca Nazionale Vittorio Emanuele III in Naples, Italy (call number ms.XII.D102)
- Istanbul map c. 1375–1400, fragment of mappa mundi, held at the Topkapi Palace in Istanbul, Turkey (call number 1828)
- Paris chart, c. 1400, portolan chart held at the Bibliotheque Nationale de France in Paris, France (call number Res. Ge. AA. 751)

According to Campbell, of the four portolan charts attributed the Cresques atelier, the Naples and Paris charts are more ornate than the other two, with the Paris chart (c. 1400) in particular seeming closest to the features of the Catalan Atlas (c. 1375). However, attribution to the Cresques workshop is only tentative. As Campbell notes, "That this group of charts is closely related is clear. But it is hard to see, from the colour analysis alone, evidence to confirm that these four charts were the product of supervised work in a single atelier."

Cresques also produced an illuminated Bible with an annexed Hebrew-Catalan dictionary, known as the Farhi Bible.

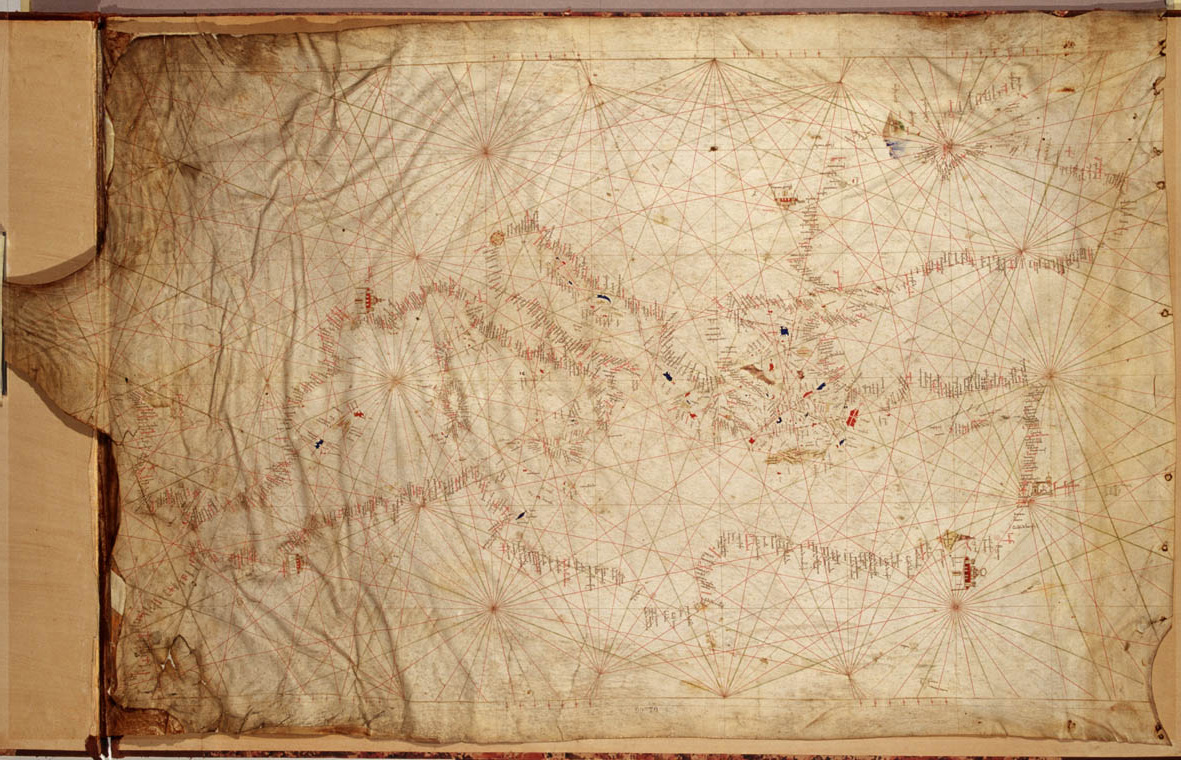
"Venice chart" (It.IV,1912),
Biblioteca Marciana, Venice

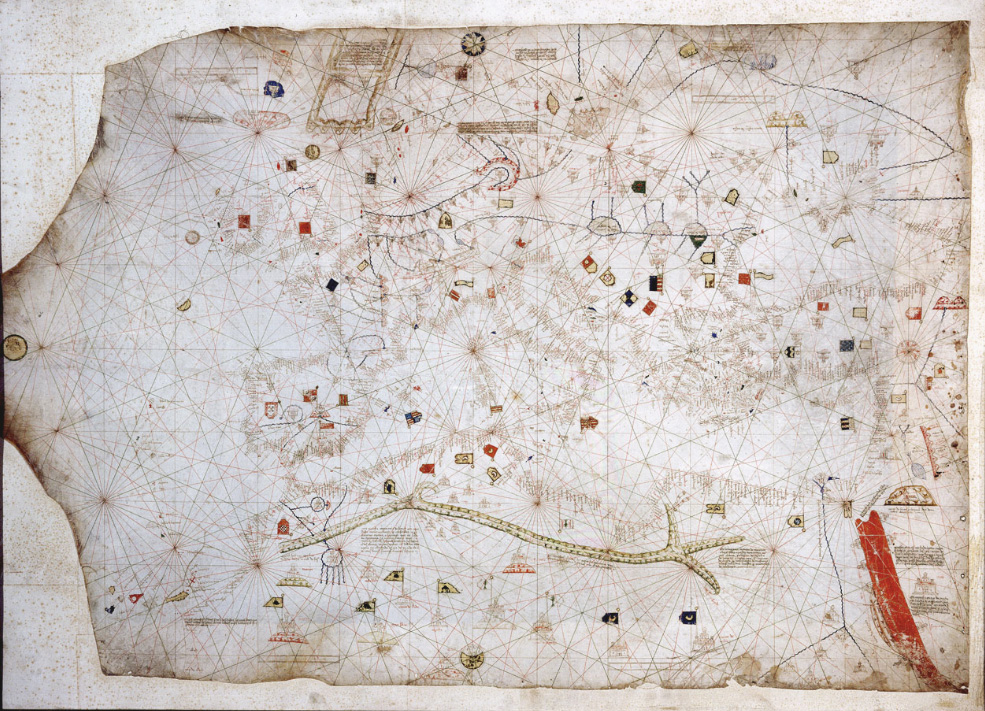
"Naples chart" (XII.D102),
Biblioteca Nazionale Vittorio Emanuele III, Naples

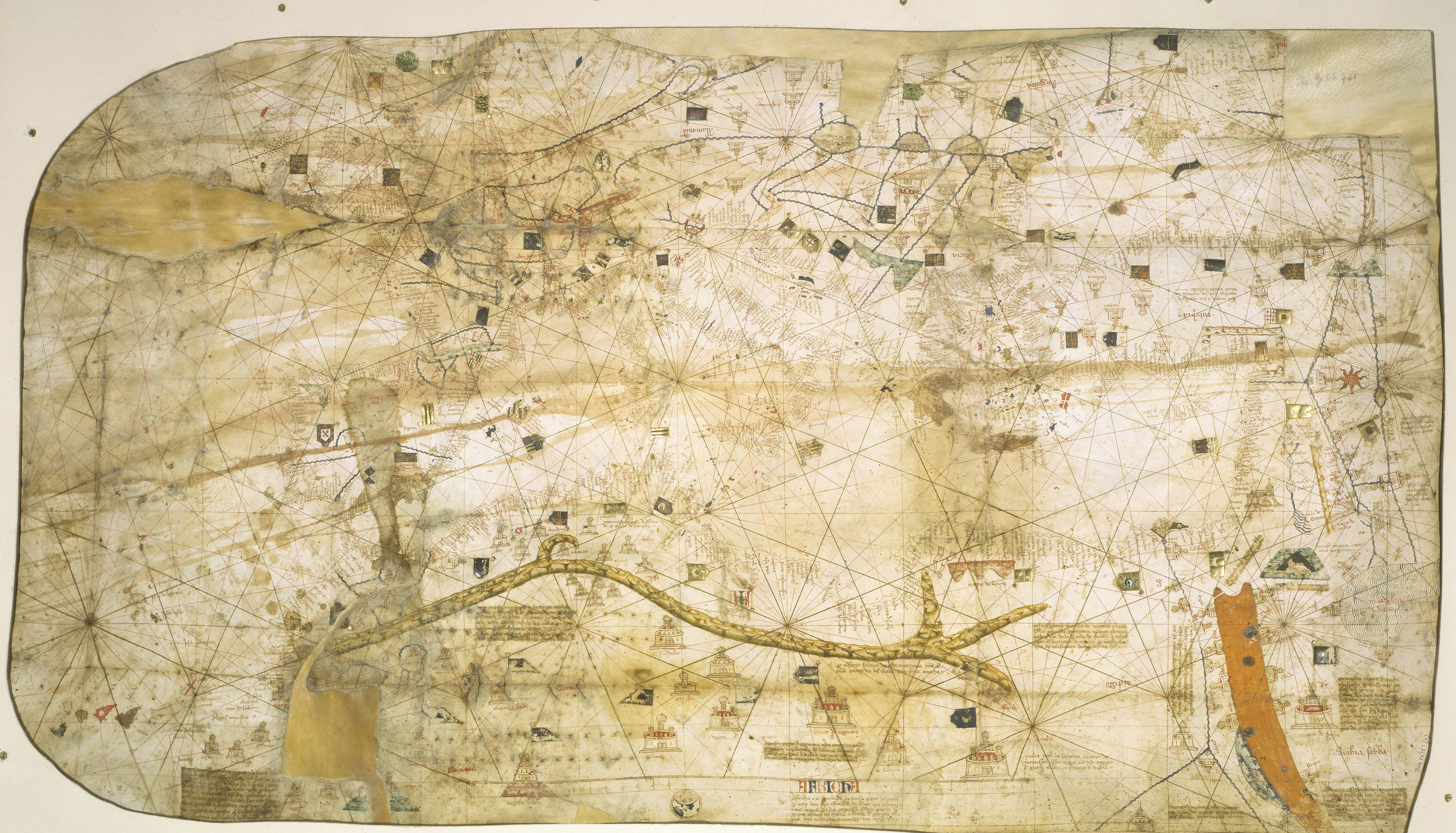
"Paris chart" (AA751),
Bibliotheque Nationale de France, Paris

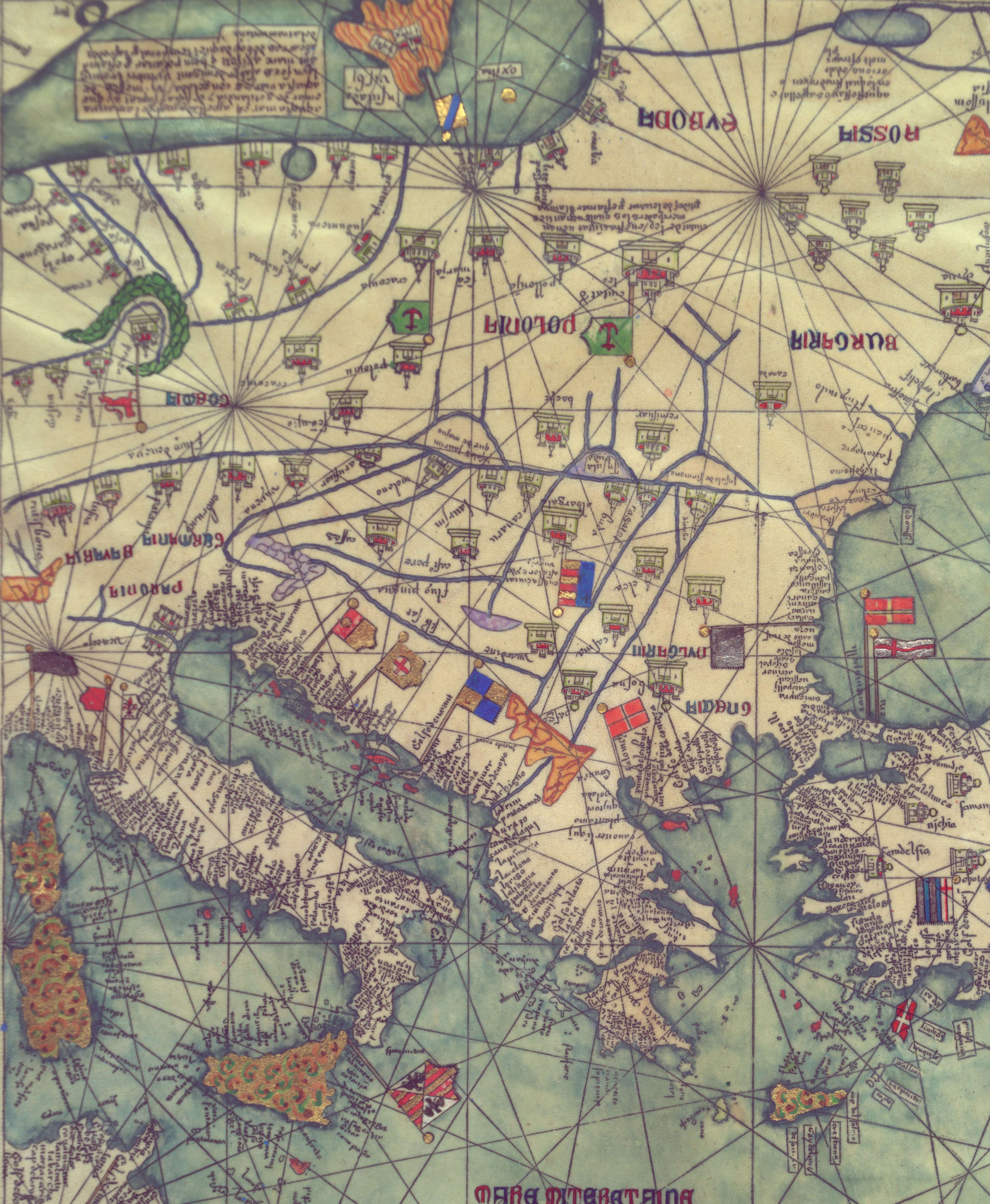
Abraham and Jehuda Cresques Catalan Atlas. Eastern Europe view from the south (detail)

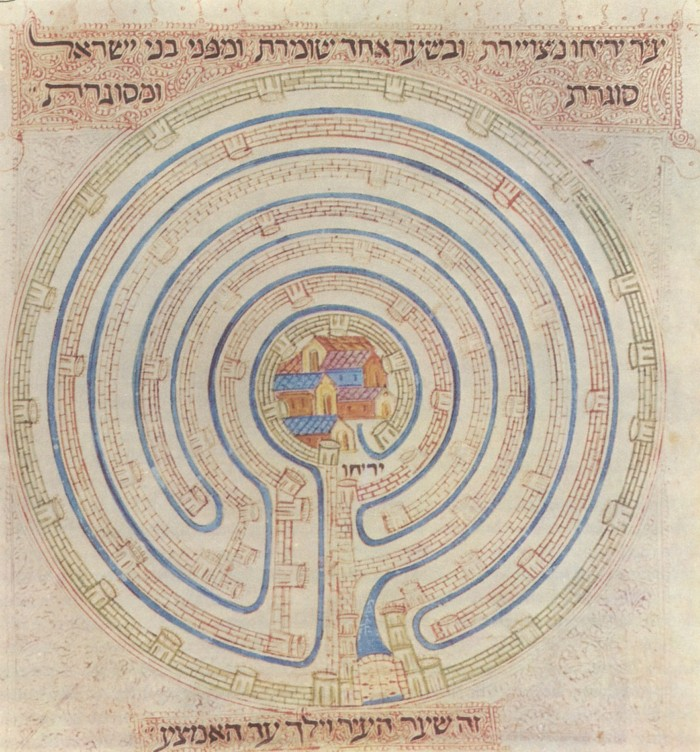
Map of Jericho in the Farhi Bible

== See also ==
- Compass rose
- Rhumbline network
