= Hy Brasil =

Phantom island in Irish myth

Hy-Brasil
Native name: Hy-Brasil, Hy Brasil, Hy Breasil, Hy Breasail, Hy Breasal, Hy Brazil, I-Brasil
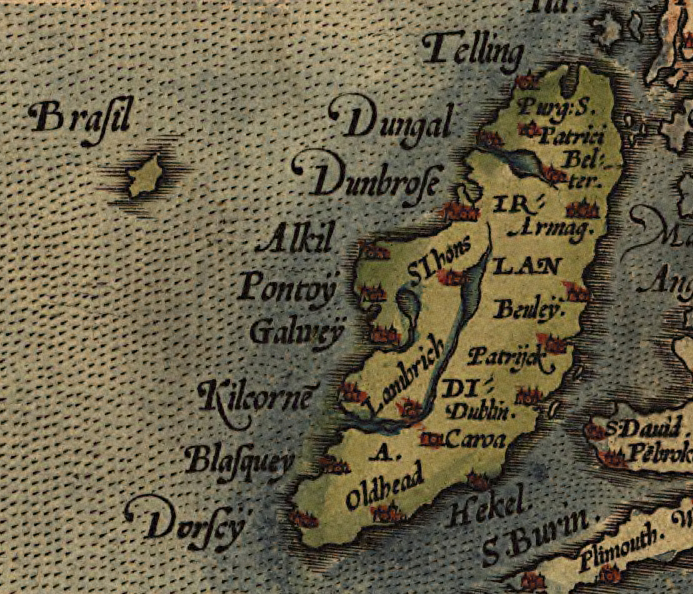
- Brasil (far left) as shown in relation to Ireland on a map by Abraham Ortelius (1572)
- Etymology: Uí Breasail: in honour of the descendants of Bresail

Geography
- Location: Mythical, Atlantic Ocean

Hy-Brasil (Note: Also known as: Hy Brasil, Hy Breasil, Hy Breasail, Hy Breasal, Hy Brazil, I-Brasil, Brasil, Brazil) (Irish: Uí Bhreasail) is a phantom island said to lie in the Atlantic Ocean west of Ireland. Irish myths described it as cloaked in mist except for one day every seven years, when it becomes visible but still cannot be reached.

== Nomenclature ==
The historian Walter Scaife (1890) noted that Brasil has been charted at various locations (cf. § Appearance on maps) with an almost equally diverse variation on the toponymy (Scaife listed thirteen spellings for "Brasil" (Note: "Brasilia, Bresilia, Prislia, Prisilli, Brasielié, Brazili, Brasil, Brassil, Brazil, Brazill, Brazile, Presillg and Brasi")).

=== Etymology ===
The etymology of the names Brasil and Hy-Brasil is uncertain, but the Italian geographer Paolo Revelli (1937) was sure it was related to the wood dye brazil. Medieval Latin brasile was the term for a dye that enjoyed great popularity as a trading commodity in the twelfth century throughout Western Europe. It has been speculated that the widespread appearance of the name served as a locational marker for sources of the dye, primarily for sailors from the Republic of Genoa where most of the maps originate. The name of the country Brazil (Portuguese: Brasil) is also connected with the brazilwood dye. It has been argued that the Irish island cannot be connected with tropical brazilwood, which cannot grow so far north, but this argument can be countered by the fact that "brazil" dye itself can be obtained from other trees that do grow in Europe.

In Irish tradition it is said to come from the Irish Uí Breasail (meaning 'descendants/clan of Bresal'), a minor Gaelic clan of northeastern Ireland, or less frequently from the Old Irish í 'island' + bres 'beauty, worth; great, mighty'.

== Appearance on maps ==
Brasil has been charted on different maps at various locations, such as "a great Antarctic continent, extending to the South Pole, or a small island near the Arctic Circle; or.. the southern part of South America or.. the vicinity of the coast of Ireland..."

Nautical charts identified an island called "Bracile" west of Ireland in the Atlantic Ocean in a portolan chart by Angelino Dulcert circa 1325, the Rex Tholomeus portolan chart circa 1360 and the Catalan Atlas circa 1375.

Later it appeared as Insula de Brasil in the Venetian map of Andrea Bianco (1436), attached to one of the larger islands of a group of islands in the Atlantic. This was identified for a time with the modern island of Terceira in the Azores, where a volcanic mount at the bay of its main town, Angra do Heroismo, is still named Monte Brasil. A Catalan chart of about 1480 labels two islands "Illa de brasil", one to the south west of Ireland and one south of "Illa verde" or Greenland.

In 1526, Roger Barlow translated Martín Fernández de Enciso's Suma de Geographia into English and included the following description:

Weste of yreland is an ylonde called the ilande of brasyll which stondeth in 51 degrees. Hit is almost rounde, of longitude it hath 12 leges and of latitude 9. ffrom Yreland to this yle of brasyll is 70 legis.

On maps the island was shown as being circular, often with a central strait or river running east–west across its diameter. Despite the failure of attempts to find it, this appeared regularly on maps lying south west of Galway Bay until 1865, by which time it was called "Brasil Rock".

Several shallow water geographical features have been suggested as the site of the legendary Brasil, such as Porcupine Bank, Yellow Ridge (Irish: Imaire Buidhe), or Rockall.

=== Map gallery ===
Catalan atlas from 1375

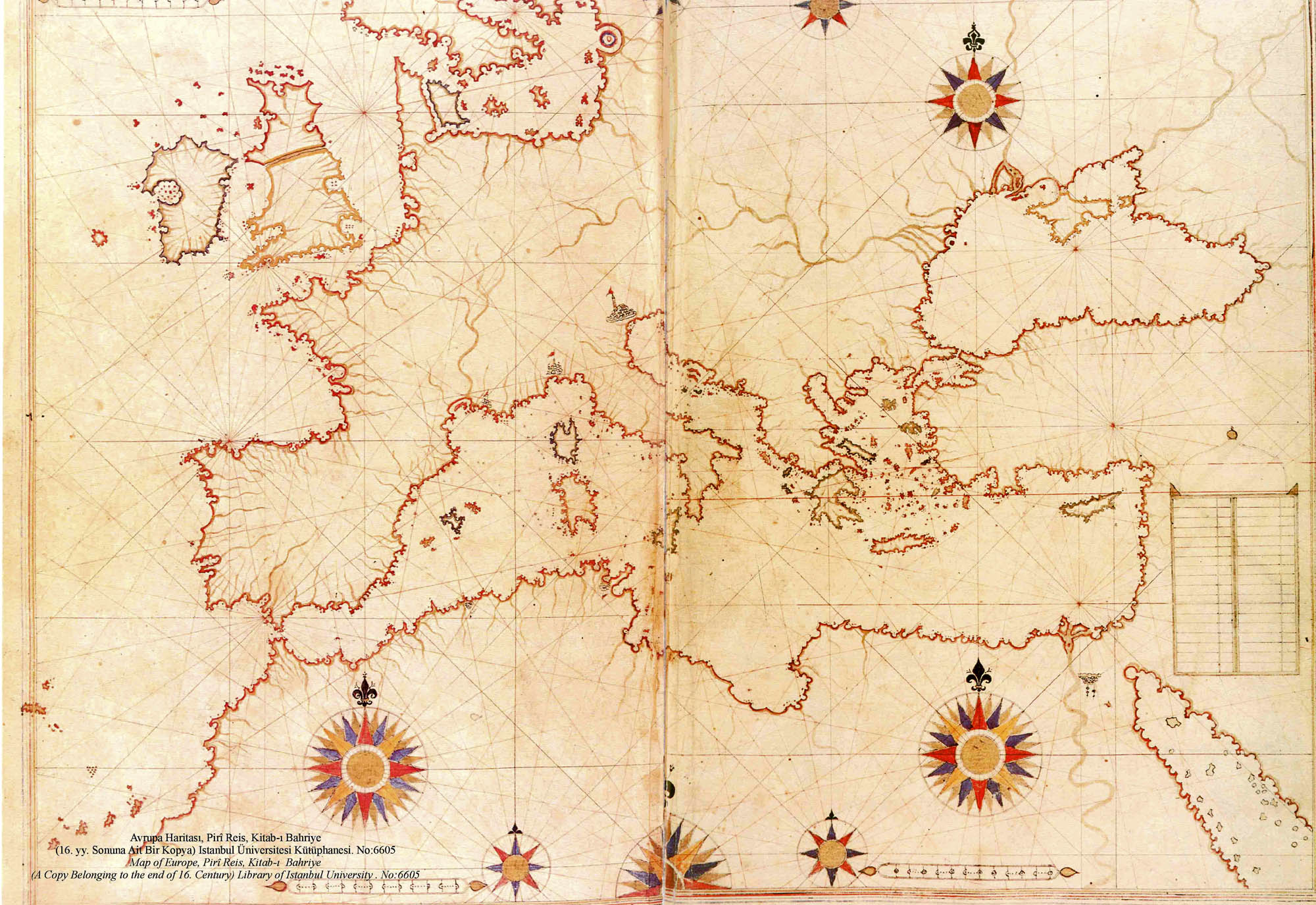
Piri Reis' map of Europe and the Mediterranean Sea from 1513

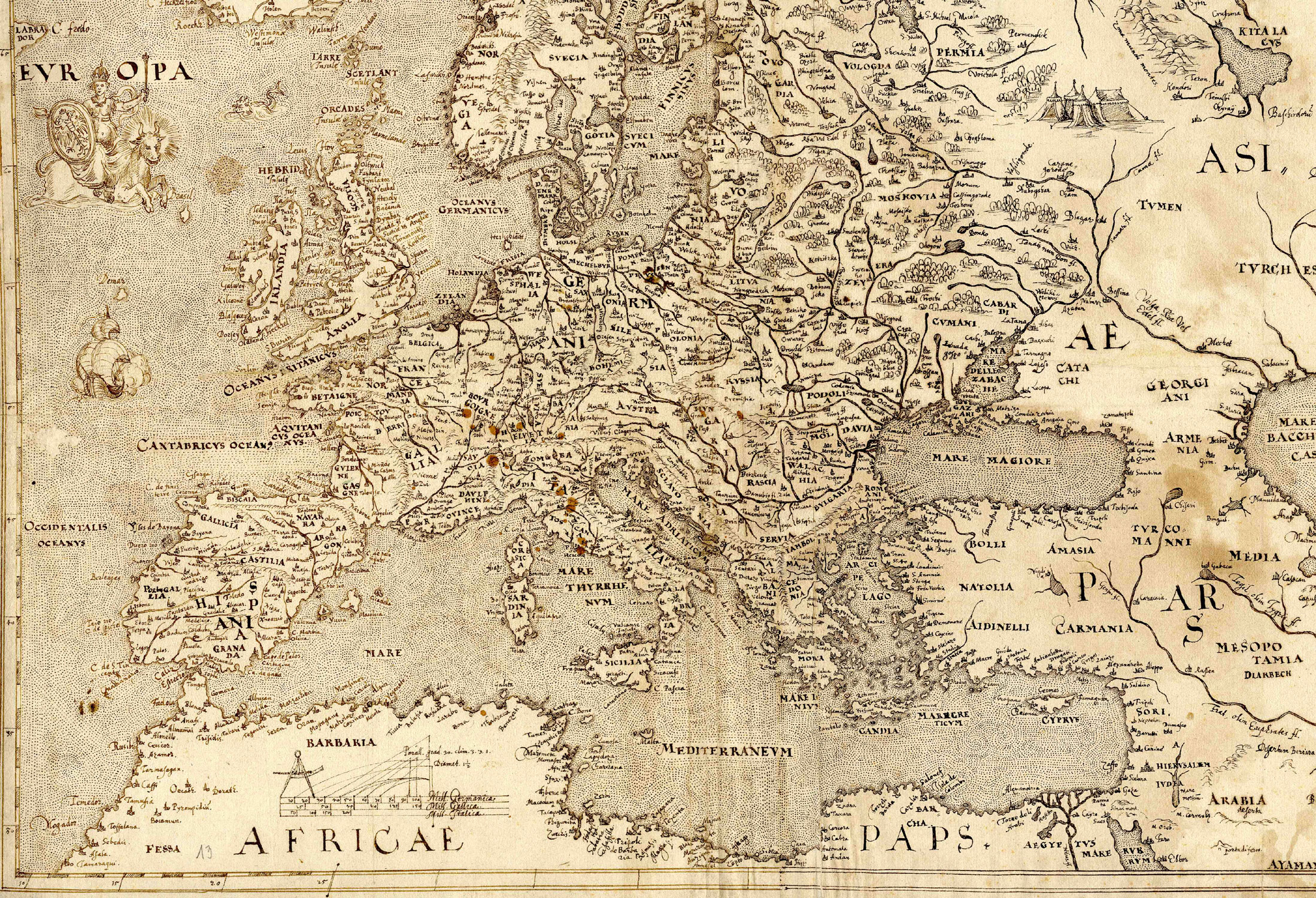
Map of Europe from 1570

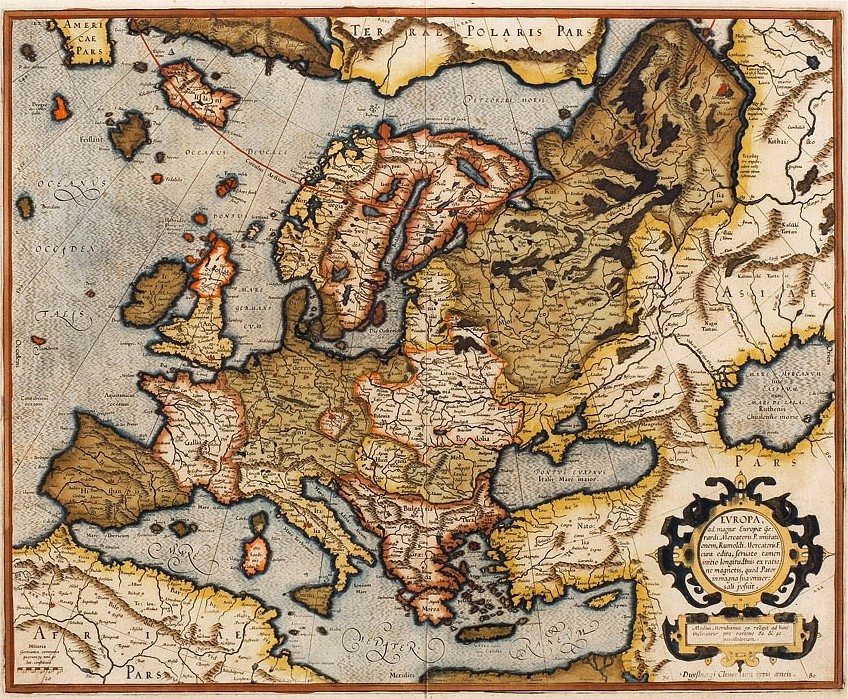
Gerardus Mercator's map from 1595

== Searches for the island ==
Expeditions left Bristol in 1480 and 1481 to search for the island; and a letter written by Pedro de Ayala, shortly after the return of John Cabot (from his expedition in 1497), reports that land found by Cabot had been "discovered in the past by the men from Bristol who found Brasil".

In 1674, a Captain John Nisbet claimed to have seen the island when on a journey from France to Ireland, stating that the island was inhabited by large black rabbits and a magician who lived alone in a stone castle, yet the character and the story were a literary invention by Irish author Richard Head. Roderick O'Flaherty in A Chorographical Description of West or H-Iar Connaught (1684) tells us "There is now living, Morogh O'Ley (Murrough Ó Laoí), who imagines he was personally on O'Brasil for two days, and saw out of it the Aran Islands, Golamhead [by Lettermullen], Irrosbeghill, and other places of the west continent he was acquainted with."

Hy-Brasil has also been identified with Porcupine Bank, a shoal in the Atlantic Ocean about 200 kilometres (120 mi) west of Ireland and discovered in 1862. As early as 1870, a paper was read to the Geological Society of Ireland suggesting this identification. The suggestion has since appeared more than once, e.g., in an 1883 edition of Notes and Queries.

== In popular culture ==
Irish poet Gerald Griffin wrote about Hy-Brasil in the early nineteenth century.

Mary Burke's short story uses the myth as an allegory of the breach caused by the Northern Irish Troubles. Mary Burke, “Hy-Brasil” in The Faber Best New Irish Short Stories, 2004–5 Ed. David Marcus. London: Faber & Faber, 2005, 101–105.

In The Hollow Hills, part of Mary Stewart's Merlin Trilogy, several characters believe (incorrectly) that the wizard Merlin has hidden the young Prince Arthur on Hy-Brasil.

In the 1989 film comedy Erik the Viking, Hy-Brasil is the location of the Horn Resounding, said to allow mortals to enter Asgard and return home safely. In the film, it is said that if blood should ever be spilled on its shores the land would sink beneath the waves.

In the 2009 book Underworld: The Mysterious Origins of Civilization, Graham Hancock attributed the appearance of Hy-Brasil on so many maps as evidence of a lost corpus of pre-Ptolemaic maps that showed evidence of substantial earth changes, including sunken islands.

In H. G. Parry's 2023 novel, The Magician's Daughter, Hy-Brasil features as an enchanted island hidden from the rest of the world.

== See also ==
- Avalon
- Irish mythology in popular culture
- Inisheer
- Tech Duinn, a mythological island to the west of Ireland where souls go after death.
- Great Ireland, a similarly west-of-Ireland place, Irish myths of which are believed to have influenced the Vikings.
- Rocabarraigh, a similar mythical island in Scottish Gaelic folklore.
- Fata Morgana, an atmospheric phenomenon that can create an illusion of a distant island where there is none
