= Murrough Ó Laoí =

Irish physician

Murrough Ó Laoí (fl. 1668 – 1684) was an Irish physician.

Ó Laoí was a descendant of a hereditary medical family to the O'Flahertys, who were first mentioned in Crichaireacht cinedach nduchasa Muintiri Murchada, c. 1000. They moved west across Lough Corrib with the O'Flahertys, continuing their profession into the 17th century. Ó Laoí lived in Letterdeskert, just west of Carna, County Galway.

== Hy-Brazil ==
Hy-Brazil is a mythical island said to be found off the west coast of Galway. In an account written in 1684, Ruaidhrí Ó Flaithbheartaigh states:

There is now living, Morogh O'Ley, who immagines he was himself personally in O'Brazil for two days and saw out of it the iles of Aran, Golamhead, Irrosbeghill and other places of the west continent he was acquainted with. The manner of it he relates, that being in Irrosainhagh, in the month of April, Anno Domini 1668, going alone from one village to another, in a melancholy humour, upon some discontent of his wife, he was encountered by two or three strangers, and forcibly carried out by boat into O'Brazil, as such as were within it told him, and they could speak both English and Irish. He was ferried out hoodwink'd, in a boat, as he immagins, till he was left on the sea point by Galway; where he lay in a friend's house for some dayes after, being very desperately ill, and knowes not how he came to Galway then. But, byt that means, about seven or eight years after, he began to practise both chirugery and phisick, and so continues ever since to practise, tho' he never stdyed not practised either in his life before, as all we that knew him since he was a boy can averr.

In a version given to John O'Donovan in 1839, Ó Laoí was a member of a ship's crew who landed on the island, and were warned off by a man who told them it was enchanted. As they were leaving, the man gave Ó Laoí a book, telling him not to open it for seven years. Ó Laoí obeyed the instructions, and was able to practise surgery and medicine. O'Donovan was told that Ó Laoí descendants had recently sold the book in Dublin.

== The Book of Hy-Brazil ==
However fanciful its given origins, the Book of Hy-Brazil exists. It was written, in Irish and Latin, in the 15th-century giving lists of diseases, their symptoms and cures under various columns. In his notes to Iar-Connacht, James Hardiman supposes that with the loss of the family lands during the Cromwellian era, Murrough invented the Hy-Brazil adventure to establish and set himself up in business, using the old family book.
