= The Scholar and the Last Faerie Door =

2024 novel by H. G. Parry

- First edition cover
- Author: H. G. Parry
- Language: English
- Genres: Historical fantasy
- Publisher: Orbit Books
- Publication date: October 2024
- Publication place: New Zealand
- Media type: Trade paperback
- Pages: 464
- ISBN: 978-0-356-52032-2

The Scholar and the Last Faerie Door is a 2024 historical fantasy novel by New Zealand author H. G. Parry. It was first published in October 2024 in the United Kingdom by Orbit Books and in the United States by its imprint, Redhook Books. The story takes place during and immediately after World War I, and concerns a faerie who kills hundreds of soldiers and curses a number of others during the Battle of Amiens in 1918.

== Plot summary ==
Clover Hill is a farmgirl living in Pendle Hill near Lancashire in England. Mathew, her older brother and a soldier in World War I, returns home in 1918 from the Battle of Amiens, inflicted with a debilitating fae curse, Clover discovers that during the battle, a mage summoned a faerie for help, and it killed hundreds of soldiers and cursed a number of others. She learns for the first time of existence of magic, and of the powerful aristocratic Families who have kept it a secret from the world for hundreds of years. She also learns of Camford, the Families' secret academy of magic attached to Oxford and Cambridge Universities. In 1920, determined to cure Mathew of his curse, Clover manages to obtain a scholarship and enrols at Camford, despite not being Family and a woman.

At Camford, Clover learns that after the tragedy at Amiens, practising faerie magic was prohibited and all the doors to faerie country were sealed. But she becomes friends with three other students, Alden, Hero and Eddie, who are also interested in studying the forbidden subject. During one of the university holidays, Alden invites the others to stay at his Ashfield mansion. Unbeknown to the others, there is a faery door in Ashfield that Alden used when he was 12 to bargain with a faerie to keep his older brother, Thomas, out of the war. The faerie kept its promise by abducting Thomas. Ever since Alden has been trying to get the faerie to release his brother. The four students experiment with what they have learnt about faerie magic and manage to open the door. The same faerie appears, but things go wrong and their binding spell that was supposed to contain the creature, fails, and it escapes and possesses Hero.

== Critical reception ==
In a review of The Scholar and the Last Faerie Door in Booklist, Lynnanne Pearson described the book as "vivid" and "intelligent". She stated that "like the best fantasy novels", it is "a mirror to our own world and the problems within it". Pearson gave the novel a "highly recommended" rating. A starred review in Publishers Weekly called the book an "ambitious historical fantasy" that "skillfully weaves together the mysterious and the mundane". It said Parry's portrayal of post-World War I England is "complex, introspective, and impressive." In another starred review, Marlene Harris stated in the Library Journal that the novel is "an immersive world of power politics, magical societies, and world-shattering consequences". She recommended it to readers who enjoyed the "post-WWI high-magic high society" in the Last Binding series by Freya Marske.

Reviewing The Scholar and the Last Faerie Door in The Fantasy Hive, Bethan Hindmarch was impressed with Parry's worldbuilding, and stated that the book's "heady mix" of faeries and secret magic societies "utterly transported me". Hindmarch complimented Parry on her characterisation and just how "believable and relatable" Clover and those around her are. She said the book reminded her of Susanna Clarke's alternate history, Jonathan Strange & Mr Norrell with its "nebulous worlds" and the mysterious fae.
