= The Magician's Daughter =

2023 novel by H. G. Parry

- First edition cover
- Author: H. G. Parry
- Language: English
- Genres: Historical fantasy; Bildungsroman
- Publisher: Orbit Books
- Publication date: 28 February 2023
- Publication place: New Zealand
- Media type: Trade paperback
- Pages: 400
- ISBN: 978-0-356-52031-5

The Magician's Daughter is a 2023 historical fantasy novel by New Zealand author H. G. Parry. It was first published in February 2023 in the United Kingdom by Orbit Books and in the United States by its imprint, Redhook Books. The novel was nominated for the American Library Association's 2024 Alex Awards.

The Magician's Daughter was generally well-received by critics, although a reviewer in Locus magazine criticised the novel for largely ignoring the narrative's historical setting.

== Plot summary ==
In 1912, sixteen-year-old Biddy lives on Hy-Brasil, an enchanted island off the coast of Ireland that is hidden from the rest of the world. After being shipwrecked and washed ashore as an infant, she was adopted by Rowan O'Connell, an Irish mage, and his rabbit-shaped familiar spirit, Hutchincroft. As she got older, Biddy found out that every night Rowan turned into a raven and flew off the island, but always returned before dawn. She questions him as to why he will not allow her to leave the island, but is told that she is not old enough. One night, Rowan does not return from his nocturnal outing. Unlike her guardians, Biddy does not have the ability to perform magic, but she uses a magical artefact from Rowan's study to enter his dreams and rescues him from a trap cast by his former fiancée, the mage Morgaine.

Safely back on Hy-Brasil, Rowan explains to Biddy the reason for his nightly excursions, and why they are hiding on Hy-Brasil. She learns that magic is a non-renewable resource, and that seventy years ago it began to run out. The British Magicians' Council in London imposed a restriction on the use of magic and started collecting all the free magic it could find for itself. All mages were instructed to surrender their magic, but Rowan and Hutchincroft defied the council and hid on Hy-Brasil where magic was still freely available. Every night Rowan flew out to search for new sources of magic and hid it from the council. But on his last trip Rowan was entrapped and betrayed by Morgaine, who is working for the council. Unfortunately, Biddy's intervention reveals the existence of Hy-Brasil to Rowan's enemies and they send wisp-like bone-creatures to attack the island. Rowan defeats them with magic, but realises that they are no longer safe on Hy-Brasil. He discovers that Biddy has a hidden source of magic in her heart that is drawing the attention of other mages. Biddy volunteers to leave the island to draw out and entrap Council magicians, and Rowan reluctantly allows her to go to London.

== Critical reception ==
Reviewing The Magician's Daughter in The Fantasy Hive, Bethan Hindmarch described the book as "an historical fantasy flavoured with folklore and whimsy". She called it a "beautiful story" filled with "heart and wonder". Hindmarch added that she was "swept away" by the mysterious Hy-Brasil, which seemed to be "trapped in time [and] given over to nature and folklore". In another review in The Fantasy Hive, Nils Shukla wrote that The Magician's Daughter "beautifully captures a classic fairytale-esque tale, filled with whimsy, magic and bittersweet longings". She liked how many of the book's characters "echo" those in classic literature, for example Biddy and Sarah Crewe in A Little Princess, and Rowan and Howl in Howl's Moving Castle. Shukla stated that while the book "revels in whimsy and charm", she did find the ending somewhat "bittersweet", in that the "happiness and ... hope" is replaced with "sadness at everything that had changed".

A starred review at Kirkus Reviews called The Magician's Daughter "a coming-of-age ... gem ... from a talented writer". The reviewer praised Parry's "worldbuilding skills" and her "magic systems that are both easily understandable and ... immersive". Publishers Weekly described this historical fantasy as a "well-researched ... mix of bildungsroman and love letter to the 19th-century English canon". The reviewer noted that Parry's notion that magic is a nonrenewable resource "works wonderfully as a metaphor for capitalism after 19th-century industrialization".

Chris Kluwe wrote in Lightspeed magazine that The Magician's Daughter is a "contemplative character study hearkening back to classic English fantasy, but lively enough to feel modern in its fairy-tale glamour". He said it reminded him of "that languid sophistication present in C. S. Lewis' The Chronicles of Narnia, and Neil Gaiman's Stardust". Kluwe noted that Parry's novel "takes its time getting to where it wants to go", but found the journey "delightful reading". He added that even the "occasional musing ... manages to condense an extremely complicated set of ideas into the kind of obvious fairy-tale wisdom that is a type of magic of its own." In a review in The Historical Novels Review, J. Lynn Else called the book "an entertaining story about magic, miracles, and found family". She said this coming-of-age story "thoughtfully explores personal growth and changing familial relationships". Else added that the magic in the novel is gradually revealed and does not overwhelm Parry's world building.

Writing in a review in Locus magazine, Liz Bourke described The Magician's Daughter as "a gorgeously atmospheric coming-of-age novel" that is "rich, detailed [and] full of sense and feeling". She called it "a triumph of skill and technique" with "imagery [that] is really striking." But Bourke complained that the book would have been even better had it dwelt more on the historical setting of the narrative. She stated that the story takes place in 1912 where Rowan, an Irish mage, is in conflict with the British Magicians' Council, yet nowhere does Parry mention the ongoing Irish Problem and the Home Rule Crisis at the time. Bourke opined that The Magician's Daughter "misses – or worse, dismisses as not interesting – part of the historical context that might well have fundamentally influenced its thematic treatment of power and marginalisation: a theme that ... defines [the novel's] shape and weight, its lasting, thought-provoking heft."
