= Rocabarraigh =

Mythological Scottish island

Rocabarra or Rocabarraigh is a phantom island or rock in Scottish Gaelic myth, which is supposed to appear three times, the last being at the end of the world.

"Nuair a thig Rocabarra ris, is dual gun tèid an Saoghal a sgrios"
("When Rocabarra returns, the world will likely come to be destroyed/ruined")

The name has also been used to refer to Rockall, a real islet in the North Atlantic. When Martin Martin visited St Kilda in 1716, he refers to it as Rockoll, but goes on to mention that the locals also knew Rockall as Rockabarra (Rocabarraigh).

The name has hints of a Norse origin, barraigh (bar-ey) being a common element in Scottish placenames. Roca may come from the Goidelic language.

== See also ==
- Rockall
- Brasil (mythical island), a similar mythical island in Irish folklore
- Brigadoon, another fictional supernatural location of Scotland
