= Suma de Geographia =

1519 Spanish pilot's manual by Enciso

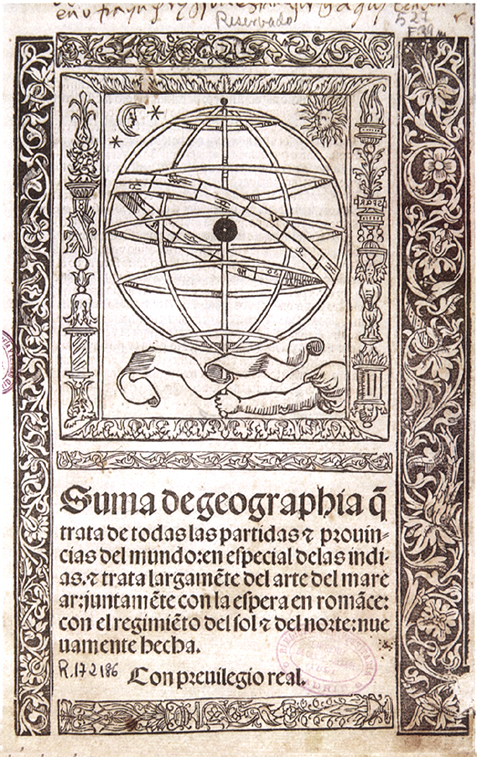
- Title page of first edition (Note: Complutense University of Madrid copy. Shows an armillary sphere wrapped in a zodiac wheel, held aloft by a disembodied left hand, enclosed by a woodcut border.)
- Author: Martín Fernández de Enciso
- Original title: Suma de geographia q̃ trata de todas las partidas ⁊ prouincias del mundo: en eſpecial delas indias. ⁊ trata largamẽte del arte del marear: juntamẽte con la eſpera en romãce: con el regimiẽto del ſol ⁊ del norte: nueuamente hecha.
- Language: Spanish
- Subject: Cosmographical treatise; pilot's manual
- Publisher: Jacobo Cromberger (Note: See Jacobo Cromberger.)
- Publication date: 1519
- Publication place: Spain
- English publication date: 1578 (Note: Partial translation.)
- Pages: 75 unnumbered leaves
- OCLC: 52045426
- LC Class: G113 .E5
- Original text: Suma de geographia q̃ trata de todas las partidas ⁊ prouincias del mundo: en eſpecial delas indias. ⁊ trata largamẽte del arte del marear: juntamẽte con la eſpera en romãce: con el regimiẽto del ſol ⁊ del norte: nueuamente hecha. at Spanish Wikisource

The Suma de Geographia (Note: Also Summa for Suma; Geografía, Geografia for Geographia. In modern Spanish orthography: Suma de geografía; lit. 'sum of geography'; 'overview of geography'.) is a Spanish print book on cosmography, geography and marine navigation by conquistador Martín Fernández de Enciso, published in 1519 in Seville. The Suma is considered the first published pilot's manual to comprehensively describe the New World as understood in the 1510s, during the Age of Discovery, by both the Spanish and Portuguese. It is further noted as the first appearance in print of the Spanish requerimiento, as the first pilot's manual published in Spanish, and as a seminal work of the period and genre.

The Suma was written by and cleared for publication in late 1518. It consists of a cosmographical treatise (to the 25th unnumbered page) followed by a geographical discourse (to the 75th unnumbered page). This second part covers both the Old and (known) New Worlds. Enciso intended to illustrate this portion with a nautical planisphere, but in the end refrained from doing so, possibly due to technical printing difficulties. According to some scholars, the Americas described in the Suma reflect Iberian geographical knowledge to about early 1517, while Enciso's unpublished map eventually did make it to print, after being replicated by Robert Thorne and smuggled to England in 1527.

== Background ==
Martín Fernández de Enciso is thought to have begun work on his Suma in Spain by at least 1518. Enciso was granted a printing patent for the Suma in Zaragoza on 5 September 1518. The work was first published in Seville towards the middle or later months of 1519 by printer Jacobo Cromberger. A revised edition was published in Seville in 1530 by Juan Cromberger, (Note: See Juan Cromberger.) and later first reprinted posthumously in Seville in 1546 by Andrés de Burgos. A partial English translation by John Frampton, titled A briefe description of the weast India and published in London in 1578 by Henry Bynneman, was the first English edition of the Suma available.

== Contents ==
The Suma is traditionally divided into two parts, namely, one regarding cosmography and nautical navigation via celestial means in general, and a second regarding geography and nautical navigation in particular, in that order. The first part (the cosmographical treatise) expounds on the configuration and functioning of the Ptolemaic universe, and further provides practical guidance on how to direct and determine the course of sailing ships. The second part (the geographical discourse) presents select features of human and physical geography in the Old and (known) New Worlds, for use as navigational aids, with said worlds split by a Tordesillas meridian running through El Hierro, which is to say, by the Ferro meridian. According to National Autonomous University of Mexico historian María del Carmen León Cázares, the said geographical discourse may reflect Iberian cartographic knowledge of the Americas as it stood "towards the beginning of 1517", including a North America prior to the Hernández de Córdoba expedition of that year, which is to say, charted without the Gulf of Mexico and some of the Yucatán Peninsula. The following table summarises the contents of the Suma, in order.

Contents of the Suma de Geographia.
Part	Contents	Start	
Preliminaries	Title page, printing patent, dedication to Charles I	1r	—
Cosmography	On the Ptolemaic universe, on the use of Sacrobosco's astronomy for cartography	3r	—
Cosmography	Solar declination tables, on the use of quadrants and astrolabes to determine latitude by reference to the North Star and sun	9v	—
Geography	Old World – Europe	25v	—
Geography	Old World – Asia	42r	—
Geography	Old World – Africa	52r	—
Geography	New World – Portuguese discoveries south of the equator, namely Brazil	63v	
Geography	New World – Spanish insular discoveries north of the equator, namely the Antilles	66v	
Geography	New World – Spanish mainland discoveries north of the equator, namely the coast from Gulf of Paria to Bay of Honduras	70v	
Geography	New World – European discoveries north of the Azores, namely Canada	75r	
Colophon	Colophon	75v	

=== Map ===
Enciso's unpublished world map is said to have been copied by Robert Thorne and smuggled to England in 1527, and then published by Hakluyt in 1582 (shown) (Note: Though this map is a facsimile reprint in the 1889 Facsimile-Atlas to the Early History of Cartography by Adolf Erik Nordenskiöld. The bottom Ⓧ and ✠ symbols show competing Portuguese and Spanish Tordesillas lines. New World labels (from north to south) are: Nova terra laboratoram dicta, Terra nec ab Anglis primũ fuit inuenta, Oceanvs occidentalis, Terra florida, Tropicvs cancri, Dominica, S. Iohanes, Figueras, Hispania nova, Darion, Eqvinoctialis, Mare Australe, Terra firma, C. S. Augustim, Tropicvs capricorni, R. S. Christophori, P. S. iulimi [?], Strictum omnium sanctorum.)

A world map was meant to accompany the aforementioned geographical discourse in the Suma. Indeed, Enciso discussed two different types of world maps, namely nautical planispheres and polar azimuthal hemispheres, and chose the former because he deemed them more suitable for pilots. However, none of the extant copies of the Suma contains any map. Some authors have blamed this on political reasons, it being feared that Portugal might have misgivings about the map's publication. Nonetheless, there is no evidence of censorship towards the Suma, and its printing patent explicitly authorized the publication of Enciso's map. It has thus been suggested that the reason for not publishing the map was technical rather than political: the inability of Iberian printing presses to handle such a large and detailed map as the one that is described in the Suma's geographical discourse.

== Legacy ==
The c. 1509 Guia náutico de Munique (damaged 1st ed. title page shown) is considered the first pilot's manual in print; it provided partial coverage of the (known) New World, first supplemented by the Suma

The Suma is commonly considered the first pilot's manual published for the New World, and the first such in Spanish. Two Portuguese manuals (roteiros), namely the Guia náutico de Munique of circa 1509 (Note: Deemed the first pilot's manual ever published. Modern copy in. Guía de Munich in Spanish. Long title: Regimento do astrolábio e do quadrante, para saber a declinação e o lugar do sol em cada um dia e assim para saber a Estrela do Norte.) and the Guia náutico de Évora of circa 1516, (Note: Modern copy in. Guía de Évora in Spanish. Long title: Tratado da esfera do mundo tirado de Latim em linguagem portuguesa com uma carta que um grande doutor alemão mandou a El-Rey de Portugal D. João o Segundo.) preceded the Suma to print, but neither provided comprehensive geographical coverage of the Americas, as both gave sailing directions only for Portuguese territory therein. The Suma is further noted as the first print book to include the Spanish requerimiento. It is thought to have been particularly significant to later Spanish works on marine navigation. According to Spanish Navy and University of Murcia historian Carmen Torres López, its unpublished world map proved "very influential" to one smuggled by Robert Thorne to England in 1527, later published by Richard Hakluyt in his 1582 Divers Voyages Touching the Discoverie of America.

== See also ==
- Peter Martyr map – 1510s Spanish map of the Caribbean
- Pineda map – 1519 Spanish map of the Gulf of Mexico and western Caribbean
- Portuguese maritime exploration
- Timeline of maritime exploration

== Notes and references ==
=== References ===
1. Fernández de Enciso M (1519). Suma de geographia, q[ue] trata de todas las partidas & prouincias del mundo: en especial de las indias: & trata largame[n]te del arte del marear: juntame[n]te con la espera en roma[n]ce: con el regimie[n]to del sol & del norte: nueuamente hecha (1st ed.). Jacobo Cronberger: Seville. LCCN 02008361.
2. Carpi E (2004). El léxico de la "Suma de Geographía" de Martín Fernández de Enciso. Estudios de la UNED. Madrid: Universidad Nacional de Educación a Distancia. ISBN 84-362-0690-8.
3. León Cázares MC (2015). "Nuevas luces sobre un antiguo testimonio acerca de los mayas: el informe de la expedicón comandada por Juan de Grijalva". Estudios de Cultura Maya. 45: 49–89. doi:10.19130/iifl.ecm.2015.45.133 (inactive 12 July 2025). ISSN 0185-2574.
4. Martínez Muñoz A (2017). "Geografía y libros de caballerías: Martín Fernández de Enciso, Jerónimo de Chaves y Paolo Giovio como fuentes de la cartografía caballeresca". Historias Fingidas. 5: 3–23. doi:10.13136/2284-2667/72.
5. Melón y Ruiz de Gordejuela A (1950). "La geografía de M. Fernández Enciso (1519)". Estudios Geográficos. 11 (38): 29–43. ISSN 0014-1496.
6. Melón y Ruiz de Gordejuela A (1961). "El primer manual español de geografía". Anales de la Universidad de Murcia: Filosofía y Letras. 19 (1): F-5 – F-18. hdl:10201/21743. ISSN 0463-9863.
7. Pintos Amengual G (2023). "The Suma De Geographia By Fernández De Enciso, 1519: Piloting and Geography". Global Journal of Human-Social Science. 23 (D1): 7–16. ISSN 2249-460X.
8. Prieto A (2010). "Alexander and the Geographer's Eye: Allegories of Knowledge in Martín Fernández de Enciso's Suma de geographía (1519)". Hispanic Review. 78 (2): 169–188. doi:10.1353/hir.0.0101. JSTOR 25703515. S2CID 162208432.
9. Robles Macías L (2024). "Polar Hemispheres: The Overlooked Alternative to Nautical Planispheres in Renaissance Iberia". The Portolan (119): 7–20.
10. Robles Macías L (2025). "El mapa perdido de la Suma de geographia de Martín Fernández de Enciso (1519)". In José María García Redondo, Vicente Pajuelo Moreno (eds.). Toda la redondeza del mundo: ciencia y experiencia de la primera circunnavegación. Edicions de la Universitat de Barcelona. pp. 213–228. ISBN 9788410500754.
11. Torres López C (27 March 2019). "Suma de Geographia (1519)". Cátedra de Historia y Patrimonio Naval (Blog). Madrid & Murcia, Spain: Armada Española & Universidad de Murcia. Archived from the original on 6 January 2024.
