= Martín Fernández de Enciso =

Spanish conquistador

- Born: c. 1469
- Died: 1533 (aged 63–64)
- Citizenship: Crown of Castile
- Occupation: Conquistador

Martín Fernández de Enciso (c. 1469 – 1533) was a Spanish lawyer, colonial official and geographer. He was instrumental in the colonization of the Isthmus of Darien, one of Spain's earliest attempts to occupy the mainland of the Americas. His successful advocacy for the rights of the Crown in the Indies led to the publication of the proclamation known as the Requerimiento in 1513. In 1519 he published Suma de Geographia, the first Spanish-language account of the New World.

== Biography ==
Enciso was born about 1469 and probably studied law. By 1508 he had a thriving legal practice in Santo Domingo, the capital of the first Spanish colony in the Americas. Gold mining was the primary activity in the colony and Enciso made his fortune from the frequent litigation in the industry.

He was instrumental in colonising the Isthmus of Darien. Enciso's 1509 expedition from Santo Domingo to aid Alonso de Ojeda saw Vasco Núñez de Balboa stow away on his ship. Enciso founded a village near the Cabo de la Vela with the name Nuestra Señora Santa María de los Remedios del Cabo de la Vela, the first settlement in the Guajira Peninsula. Due to constant attacks from the indigenous and pirates the village was moved to present-day Riohacha in 1544.

== Suma de Geographia ==
His Suma de Geographia que trata de todas las partidas e provincias del mundo, published in 1519 in Seville, was the first account in the Spanish language of the geography of the New World. Among other things, this document contains one of the first western descriptions of the avocado.

In this book, Enciso states that they found an indigenous population who called themselves the “'Veneciuela.’” This suggests that the name "Venezuela" may have evolved from the native word. (The conventional etymology of Venezuela, however, cites Amerigo Vespucci, who, seeing the indigenous palafitos, was reminded of the city of Venice, and therefore named this New World location, "Little Venice".)
