= H. G. Parry =

New Zealand writer and academic

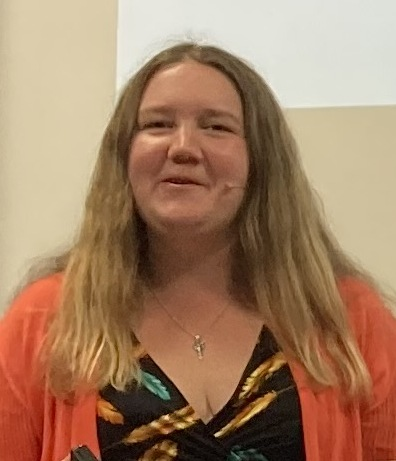
- Parry at DWRF, 2021
- Born: Hannah Gabrielle Parry
- Education: Victoria University of Wellington (DPhil)
- Occupations: Writer; academic
- Writing career
- Period: 2014–present
- Genres: Contemporary fantasy; historical fantasy
- Scientific career
- Thesis: The Aeneid with Rabbits: Children's Fantasy as Modern Epic (2016)
- Website: hgparry.com

Hannah Gabrielle Parry is a New Zealand writer and academic, who has written five fantasy novels and several works of short fiction. Parry has a PhD in English Literature from the Victoria University of Wellington and has contributed to several papers on English literature. Parry lives in Wellington where she writes and teaches English literature.

Parry's novels are contemporary fantasy and historical fantasy, and have been generally been well received by critics. A starred review in Publishers Weekly called A Declaration of the Rights of Magicians "a witty, riveting historical fantasy" and stated that "Parry has a historian’s eye for period detail and weaves real figures from history throughout her poetic tale of justice, liberation, and dark magic." A Declaration of the Rights of Magicians was nominated for the 2021 New Zealand National Science Fiction Convention Sir Julius Vogel Award.

Parry's research interests include Victorian literature and children's stories. Her PhD thesis, "The Aeneid with Rabbits: Children's Fantasy as Modern Epic", centred around Richard Adams's Watership Down. She has published articles in the Journal of New Zealand Literature, and authored chapters in Antipodean Antiquities: Classical Reception Down Under (2019) and Critical Insights: The Hobbit (2016).

== Bibliography ==
=== Novels ===
==== The Shadow Histories ====
- A Declaration of the Rights of Magicians (Orbit, 2020) – nominated for the 2021 Sir Julius Vogel Award.
- A Radical Act of Free Magic (Orbit, 2021)

==== Standalone ====
- The Unlikely Escape of Uriah Heep (Orbit, 2019)
- The Magician's Daughter (Orbit, 2023)
- The Scholar and the Last Faerie Door (Orbit, 2024)
- A Far Better Thing (Tor Books, 2025)
- The Witch Below the Dreaming Wood (Orbit, 2026)

=== Novella ===
- "Heartless" (Subterranean Press, 2024)

=== Collections ===
- Adonais: and Other Stories (Charnel House, 2021) – collection of short fiction by Parry

=== Short fiction ===
- "Until We Find Better Magic" (Orson Scott Card's InterGalactic Medicine Show, September 2014)
- "Tommy" (Daily Science Fiction, February 2015)
- "Electricity Bill for a Darkling Plain" (Orson Scott Card's InterGalactic Medicine Show, May 2015)
- "Impossible Things Before Breakfast" (Unpublished, 2015; Adonais: and Other Stories, 2021)
- "Material Without Being Real" (Orson Scott Card's InterGalactic Medicine Show, September 2016)
- "The Citizen" (Unpublished 2016; Adonais: and Other Stories, 2021)
- "Adonais" (Adonais: and Other Stories, 2021)
