= Iberian cartography, 1400–1600 =

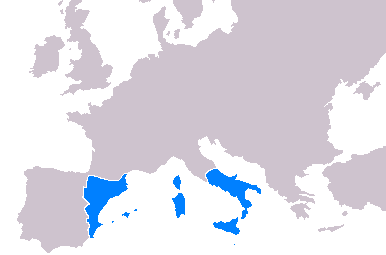
The Crown of Aragon began its expansion in the 13th century under James I of Aragon, and by the 14th-16th centuries, its territories included the Duchy of Neopatras (in modern Greece), Kingdom of Sicily, Isle of Sardinia, isle of Corsica, Kingdom of Mallorca, Kingdom of Valencia, Principality of Catalonia and Kingdom of Aragon.

Cartography throughout the 14th-16th centuries played a significant role in the expansion of the kingdoms of the Iberian Peninsula for a multitude of reasons. Primarily, the maps developed during this period served as navigational tools for maritime folk such as explorers, sailors and navigators. Mostly the expansion of the Crown of Aragon, which included the Kingdom of Aragon, Kingdom of Valencia and Kingdom of Majorca, together with the Principality of Catalonia, all of them territories with seashore on the Mediterranean Sea. The Crown of Aragon controlled the routes across the Mediterranean Sea from the Kingdom of Jerusalem to Europe, as part of the commercial trade route known as the Silk Road.

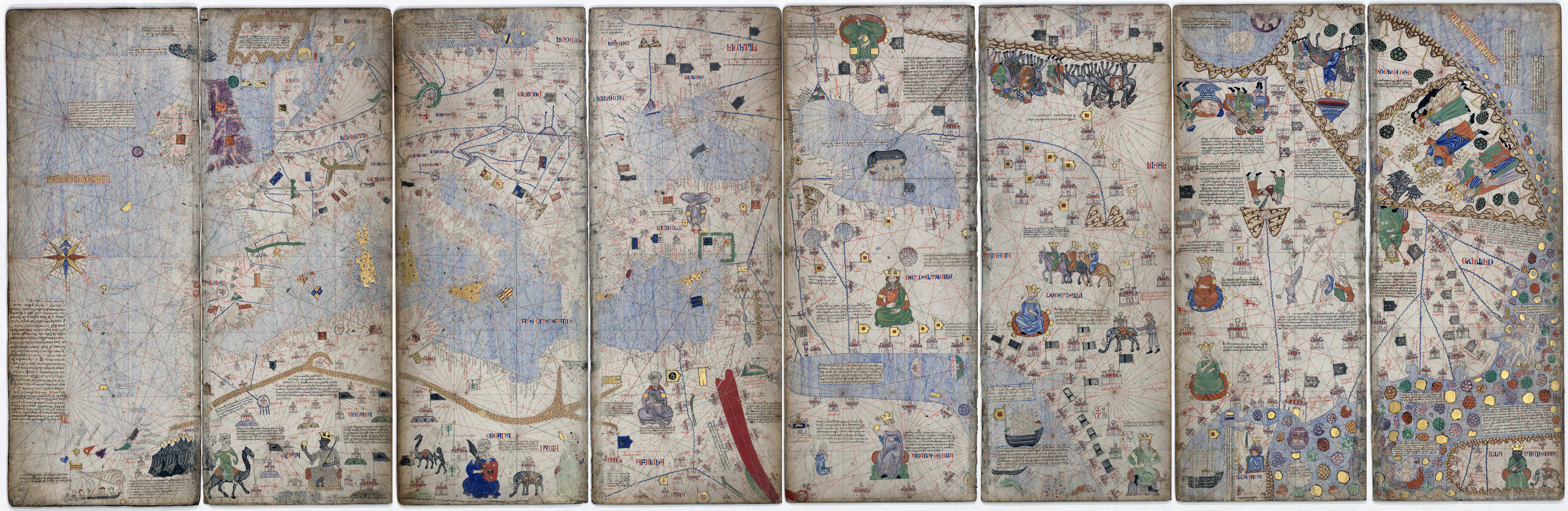
Dating from 1375, the full 8 sheet Catalan Atlas made by Abraham Cresques, cartographer to King Pere IV of Aragon. It was a gift from the King of the Crown of Aragon to the King of France. Many later maps and "portolan charts" are copies of this original Catalan one.

They were used to make the travel occurring at the time easier by eliminating the unnecessary resources spent when the most efficient route was not taken, and after things such as wind patterns and latitude and longitude began to appear on maps. they made maritime activities such as exploration or conquest less time- and resource-consuming. Maps were also used as a method to plan out landmasses by surveyors in areas that had yet to be explored or did not have many documented statistics. This often was the case in the Americas, where the Iberian empires did not start off with much documented evidence of the landmasses.

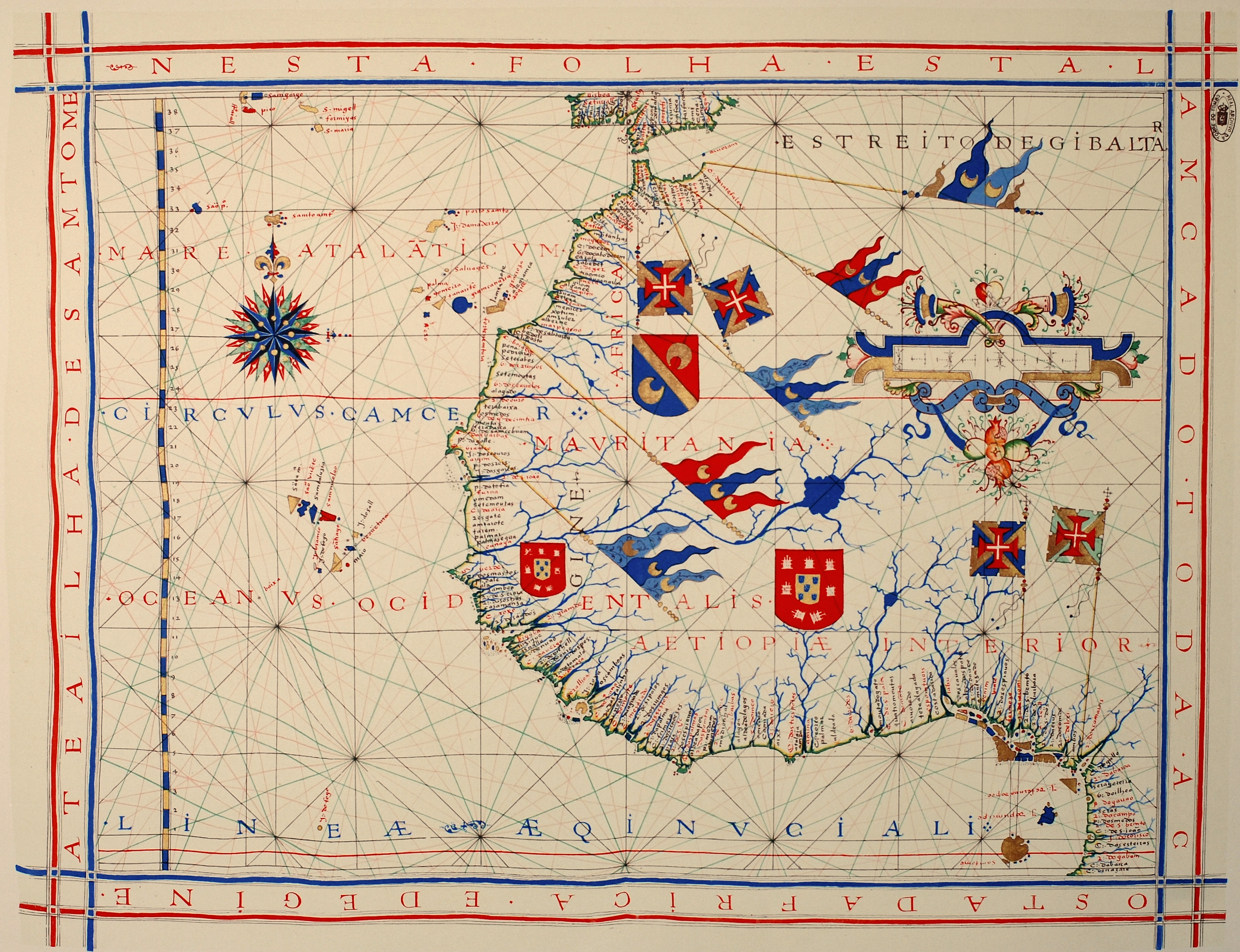
A pre-Mercator nautical chart of 1571, from Portuguese cartographer Fernão Vaz Dourado (c. 1520–c. 1580). It belongs to the so-called plane chart model, where observed latitudes and magnetic directions are plotted directly into the plane, with a constant scale, as if the Earth were plane (Portuguese National Archives of Torre do Tombo, Lisbon).

Even still, oftentimes before the availability of maps began to increase, they were used as decorative pieces that were commonly gifted to individuals of very high social status such as kings or popes. Those particular maps frequently had descriptive legends, which usually consisted of drawings being integrated into the actual map. An example of such a map would be the heavily decorated Catalan Atlas, which was produced in 1375. It was used as a gift to the King of France from the King of the Crown of Aragon.

One other purpose behind maps was propaganda, and in those circumstances they were used to possibly distort or falsify information. The Dutch used a particular map, which was known as the 'Christian knight map' for this purpose during their struggle for independence against Spain. In relation to both Spain and Portugal and their influences on each other in terms of cartography, there was one very significant and fairly obvious example that began to develop in the 15th century. The Portuguese had begun to use scales of latitude on their nautical charts, and once Portuguese cosmographers were being recruited by the Crown of Castile, the same lines began to appear on Spanish charts as well, which eventually developed into what is known as a plane chart.

== Evolution of the map-making process ==
Evolutionary-wise, the specific measurements used in sea charts began to have a practical impact on world maps beginning in the early 14th century with the inclusion of latitude and longitude. Before hand, cartographic works had been developed through less rational methods than mathematical, such as theology and cosmology, but did include statements of geography and history as well. The beginning of the 14th century also introduced the first atlas, which was created through a series of maps being bound together. The new innovation was not just for show, however, as it had many practical uses due to its improved portability and durability, as well as making it easier for the readers to see. Map-making technique began an alteration through geographical thought. While not every map looked the same, a pattern of features developed through the round shape and typical inclusion of some sort of paradise, and were found on many of the maps of that time.

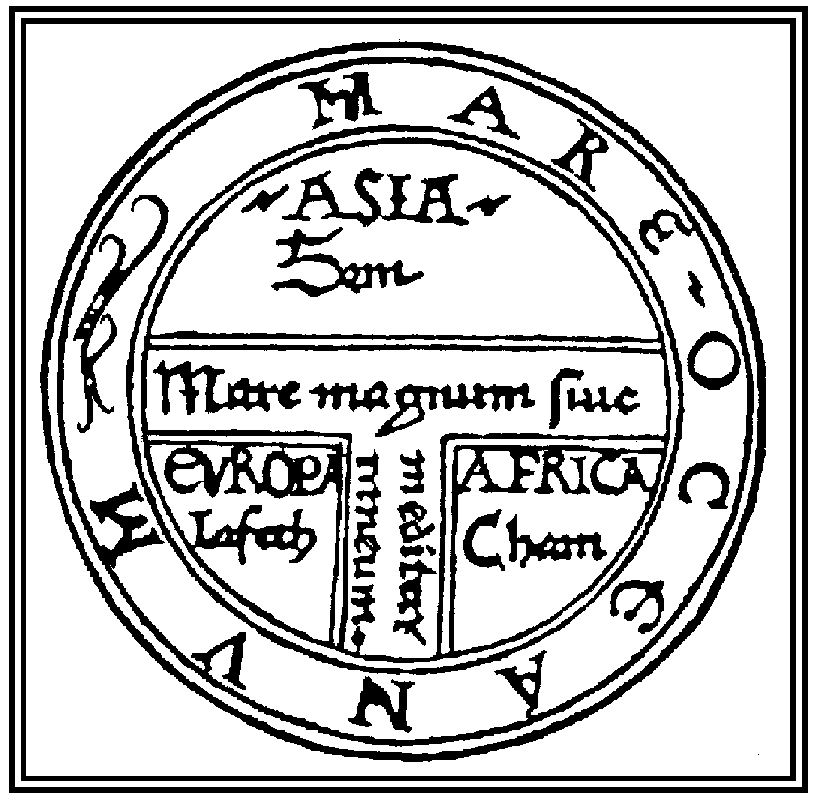
Copy (1475) of St. Isidore's T and O map of the world.

To better understand the map-making process, a step back in time is required, as Claudius Ptolemaeus, better known as Ptolemy, whose eight-volume work entitled Geography played a large role in the development of cartography once it was translated into Latin in 1406. Ptolemy projected two different types of maps in his text. The first, known as a conic projection, dealt with the latitude parallels consisting of round arcs. The second, known as a pseudoconic projection, consisted of longitude lines being round. Ptolemy's work were heavily influential in Islamic science as well, whose maps were quite similar to the Portolan charts and were partly influential on the Catalan map by Abraham Cresques. In the early 14th century, many of the maps were known as T and O maps, termed because of a circle representing the earth, and within the circle a T-shape to designate the division of different known land masses, which were Europe, Africa, and Asia. This particular style was representative in the well-known Spanish Mappa Mundi which was developed a few centuries beforehand, but was also the first map to actually be printed in 1472. Some of these earlier maps relied heavily on Arabic influence, which is evident in the inclusion of frequent Arabic place names. It is thought that this information could have been gathered through experiences throughout different trade routes. The T-O style of map shows a lack of information regarding the specific details of land masses, but once trade began to flourish, so did the detail in maps. Following the simplicity of the T-O style, maps began to grow into a greater, fantasy-inspired style. Where beforehand, the descriptiveness was minimal, maps now included beautiful drawings of angels and mythical creatures, and oftentimes these maps were used to understand what was considered to be the history. In the 15th century, maps began to develop an idea and representation of distinctive frontiers. Where the previous maps had indulged in fantastical depictions, terminology began to show up much more frequently now, such as names for regions and provinces. The influence of an eastern orientation was one of the first things to change from the typical features of maps with the loss of fantastical creatures being depicted and the inclusion of more detailed landmasses, and it is possible that this was happening because Arabic influence was causing maps orientation to move away from the east and more toward the south.

== Portolan charts ==
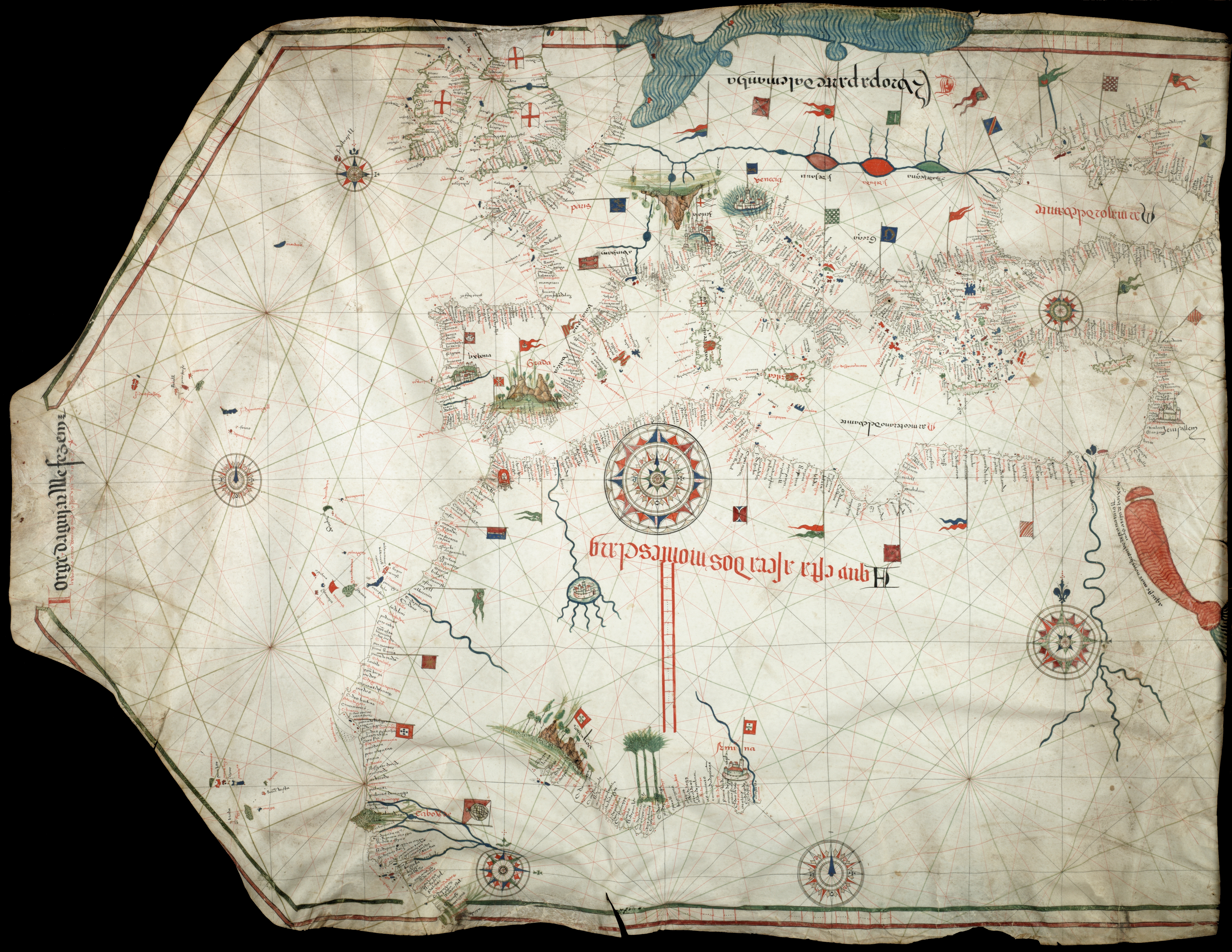
Portolan chart by Jorge de Aguiar (1492), the oldest known signed and dated chart of Portuguese origin (Beinecke Rare Book and Manuscript Library, University of Yale, New Haven, USA)

The term portolan is derivative from portolano which translates from Italian into 'pilot's book.' While the orientation of earlier maps was generally in the east, and then it moved southward with the Arabic influence established throughout various trade routes, Portolan charts were oriented to the north to make them easier to read. Portolan charts began to surface just prior to the beginning of the 14th century, but the division of such a practical creation was very significant in the map-making world. They were specifically used to solve specific problems. Each chart was an individual, which is important in comparison to the typical map, which had to be studied often with some sort of text to accompany it. The development of Portolan charts is thought to have begun due to an increasing overseas trade empire. Portolan charts were produced with a combination of chart and compass, allowing sailors to venture out farther onto the open water without as significant of a fear of the hopelessness of getting lost. The manufacturer of the chart would draw a scaled distance along with compass bearings to create angles in order to connect the different areas. Using the chart, the sailor or navigator would set a course from one point to the next, and then use what are known as rhumb lines, which are lines of longitude that all cross the meridian at exactly the same angle, to translate the desired course onto a compass heading.

The charts included descriptive depictions of coastlines, as well as islands, which enabled seafarers who were accustomed to using such navigational tools as the compass to find their way to said coasts and islands at sea. Included on the chart were a series of thick lines that would be used along with the compass to gather ones bearings. Oftentimes the charts did not include any information on inland structures. There were exceptions, but they were few and usually limited to library copies. Not all maps designating information that would be most beneficial to Iberian empires were being produced in Portugal or Spain, and the same applied to the information utilized by the Portolan charts. Other maps were being produced in Italy and in Germany, both of which were incorporating not just geographical ideas, but religious and academic ideas as well. At the same time, they were using the information that Portuguese seamen had ambitiously acquired. The charts of sailing directions expanded as new sailing routes became more prominent, such as what happened when the Canary Islands were initially discovered, followed by the discovery of other Atlantic islands. As was the case with general map-making, some of the charts began to incorporate decorative depictions in them as well. Navigational instruments like these did not just have a significant impact on the idea of space through the Iberian empires, but they also played a role in mobility as well. With the use of practical tools like the Portolan charts, people were able to more successful navigate and respectively move class-wise based upon said success.

== Spanish oceanic and land exploration and navigation ==
Unlike the maps being created in Portugal, those produced in Spain were heavily guarded with an air of secrecy. The Habsburgs heavily guarded the maps and their advanced level of geographical knowledge because they did not want any of their rivals to be able to obtain them in any way to use against them or to use in order to expand their own empires into lands that Spain was eying. The protection of the maps from falling into undesirable hands was done by the prohibition of any of the maps to appear in print. This prevented anybody who was not an active involved person in the business of Spain's empire to view the maps. With the printing of Spanish maps not just discouraged, but entirely restricted, there are very few that have survived. Cartography was not at all absent from the Spanish Empire. Quite the contrary, they were used as an imperial effort to self-represent themselves as an Atlantic or global empire. A majority of this focus was placed upon the Indies and creating a spatial representation of structures that they had yet to examine, but needed to integrate with geographical data that they had already obtained in order to develop maps.

As mentioned previously, the revolution of Ptolemy’s rational thinking was what created such a powerful period in time when it came to cartography, because it was uniting transparency with yet-to-be-realized political function. Spain utilized this through its American empire. At time, through cartography, Spanish culture has been able to elaborate on more than a two-dimensional idea of space, especially in the instances where climates are shown as a 'portion of the sphere.' That being said, outside of cartography, there is a lack of the idea of space in other aspects of the culture.

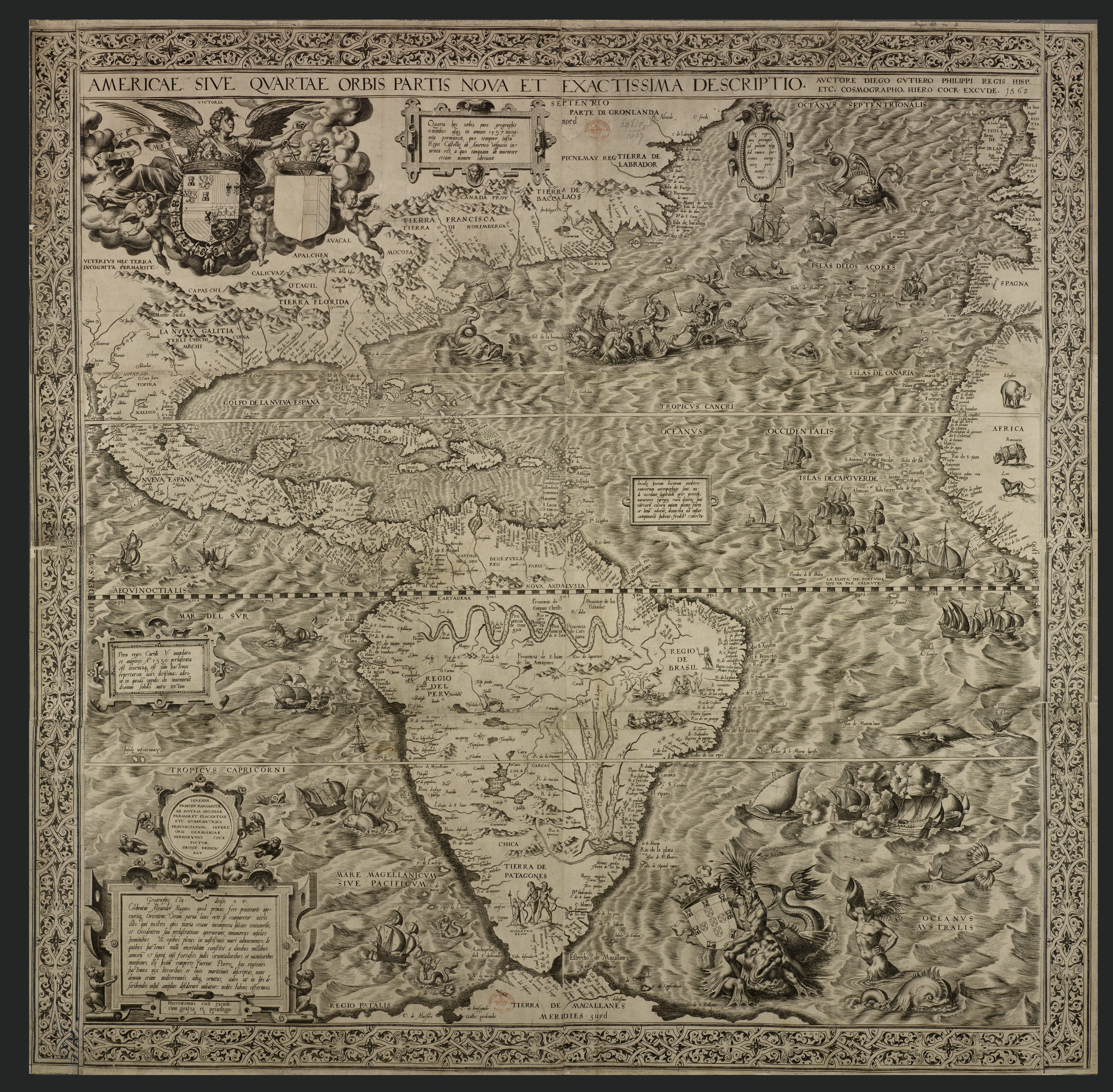
Americae Sive Qvartae Orbis Partis Nova Et Exactissima Descriptio, 1562

With landmass structures, opposed to the original ocean-focus, becoming more popular on maps, two things began to change when it came to Spanish cartography. First of all, space was being considered in a different light, and secondly, the way maps were drawn began to change as well. Many of these changes were happening in result of the exploration of the New World. Where previously maps had been under close guard, availability began to increase. Not only that, but the significance of cartographic depiction followed a similar trend and geographical connotations were no longer limiting the way maps were developed. In order to figure the best way to establish control of sovereign land, government officials of Spain began to record, in mass detail, about the territorial land of said establishments. They did not do this without significant prompting, but it still occurred. The information obtained to fill the requirements to take record was often taken from merchants who could provide accurate information based upon experience. Utilizing the significant information allowed for the Spanish empire to develop appropriate policies to incorporate into the expanding areas. While the extreme precautions taken to keep Spanish maps hidden might allude to the fact that maps were not a part of the imperial effort that was not the case. Maps were very much a part of the self-representations of Spain, which was able to show itself as an Atlantic empire through the cartographic lens. Through their efforts and ambitions, which were visually recorded on the relatively few Spanish maps that survived, Spain was able to facilitate a persistence of cultural trends. Delving deeper into that, a representation of it can be made through the relationship between Spain and America, which is where a geometric rationalization really began to occur through cartography in terms of space. It was in the late sixteenth century when Spain was able to represent this idea through rationalizing the American Empire, which was beginning to spread a bit too thinly.

As time progressed into the 16th century, the development of Spanish maps began to increase, primarily those that were depicting the New World. The actual numerical amount of the maps is unknown, but it isn't thought to have been particularly low. The thing was, however, that they only existed in a manuscript form, and still only certain people were able to get their hands on said manuscript. That is still an improvement from how strictly the Spanish were guarding their maps in earlier centuries, but there was still an air of that protectiveness. For the most part, only people who were involved in the exploration or conquest of the New World were able to obtain the maps. There were a few exceptions to that particular rule that included people who were well-versed in Latin, educational publications for the learned, or being produced for those who were not within the boundaries of the Iberian land. Average readers who wanted to look at such a map would either have to gain access to a black market version or find a woodcut production.

== Portuguese oceanic and land exploration and navigation ==
Cartography played a large role in the establishment of the expansive Portuguese trade route, and similarly, the trade route played its role in Portuguese cartography. Maps included certain knowledge obtained solely through the connections Portugal had made through their trade routes in Africa and the East, although many of the maps unfortunately did not survive. The oldest signed Portuguese nautical chart, created by Pedro Reinel, dates back to 1485. Within the first fleets that were sent into the East by Portugal of which there were hopes to develop an economic and trade relationship between the two empires, the leaders of the expedition specifically hired pilots who would be able to gather accurate information in a geographical and navigational sense about the Indian Ocean. There was a map smuggled into Italy in 1502 of Portuguese origin that was documented evidence that the before mentioned pilots were able to gather accurate information, and with that, they created a picture of eastern Africa and western India that was both detailed and valid. As previously mentioned, not only did cartography have a cooperative relationship with the establishment of commerce, but the same applied in a reverse relationship as well. The early expeditions created the well-known Cantino map, but they also were cause of the gathering of information dealing with trade within the Indian Ocean region, which was important in the establishment of Portugal's expansive trade routes.

"Terra Brasilis", Miller Atlas, 1519, French National Library.

Not all of the information on charts and maps were limited to the seas and oceans, or even the coastlines for that matter. That was primarily the case, but there were exceptions. There were copies of maps that did include information about land areas past the coast, though they were usually reserved for library use. An example of a map that did include land information, as well as trade information that surpassed what was typically on a map, was the Catalan Atlas, which was dated 1375. When the Portuguese explored coasts, for example the coast of West Africa, cartographers and navigators would carefully record progress. They were sure to include the names of the places they encountered, as well as doing their best to draw the coast. Unlike Spain, however, despite the fact that there was supposedly a policy of secrecy attached to these records, it was quite often that as soon as data from the voyages was obtained, it was almost instantly recorded for public use and knowledge. Specifically, cartographers began to include actual definition in the territorial land. Cities, rivers, and mountain ranges all began to show up on some maps, whereas others still just included the bare minimum of the outline of the coast. Building from that, maps began to take on an ornamental value. No longer were the purposes just restrained to the seeking of political and economic knowledge, but they became decorative. Building upon the evolution of cartography, the Portuguese went from simply incorporating the waters they traveled to incorporating land masses such as cities, mountains, and rivers. The Portuguese expanded map-making even further by the introduction of the representation of wind systems in the making of their maps.

Once they began to correctly understand the wind systems in both the Indian and Atlantic Oceans, they were able to use that knowledge in order to expand their global trade routes even further, which in turn established an even further spread out empire. While the Portuguese were very innovative in their map-making, they still relied heavily on the cartographical knowledge of others, such as the Arabs, Japanese, and Chinese, when it came down to the actual observing and mapping of the global world. They did obtain their own information, but the maps were visibly a mixture of those observations, as well as other information that they had taken from other experts on cartography. The knowledge and the methods of obtaining information used by Portuguese cartographers drew upon the skill and knowledge of Muslim navigators. That being said, they still would conduct their own evaluations by writing down details they obtained when at port in other areas. The same applied to how they obtained some of their information of the land masses that were beginning to show up more and more in maps, opposed to the former method of just applying information regarding to the seas and oceans.

As time progressed into the late sixteenth century, Portugal’s ocean-based trade routes began to become more widely known. While their maps were not nearly as heavily guarded as those under the Habsburg rule in Spain, they were still kept within Portugal. That began to change when those maps had started to appear abroad. Not only that, but Portuguese navigators began to take positions in other countries, which furthered the spread of the Portuguese Empire in other nations. The Portuguese also attempted to utilize cartography in order to integrate the indigenous people under colonial rule. Displacement of these indigenous populations did occur in under a cartographic lens, but despite that, a representation of imperial space was established.

== See also ==
- Age of Discovery
- Iberian ship development, 1400–1600
- Iberian nautical sciences, 1400–1600
- Portuguese discoveries
- Majorcan cartographic school (Catalan chart)
- Early modern Netherlandish (Dutch and Flemish) cartography, influenced by early modern Iberian (Spanish and Portuguese) cartography
