= Iberian nautical sciences, 1400–1600 =

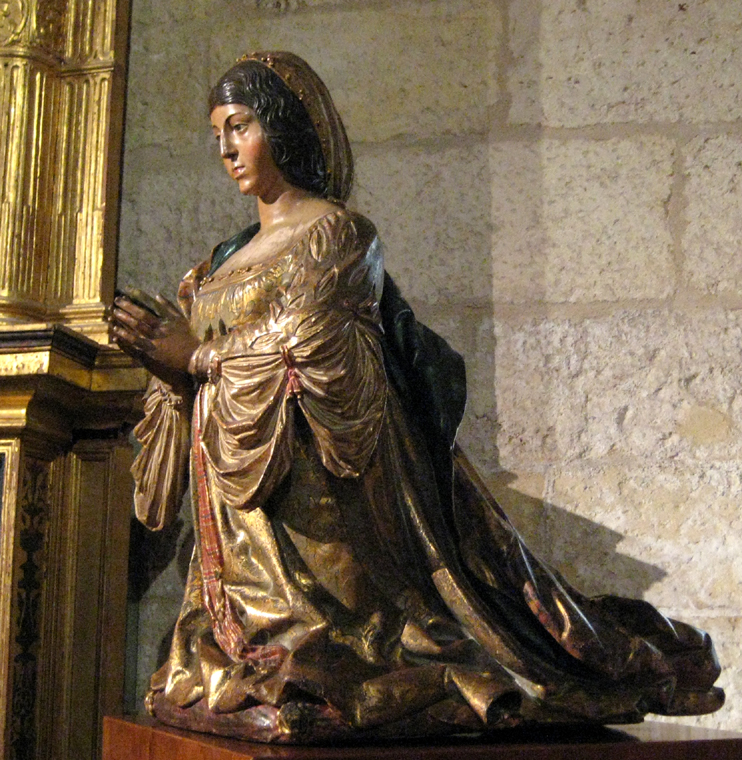
Statue of Isabella by Bigarny; it resides in the Capilla Real, in Granada

Throughout the early Age of Exploration, it became increasingly clear that the residents of the Iberian Peninsula were experts at navigation, sailing, and expansion. From Henry the Navigator's first adventures down the African coast to Columbus's fabled expedition resulting in the discovery of the new world, the figures that catalyzed the European appetite for expansion and imperialism heralded from either Portugal or Spain. However, merely a century earlier, nautical travel for most peoples was resigned to keeping within sight of a coastline and very rarely did ships venture out into deeper waters. The period's ships were not able to handle the forces of open ocean travel and the crewmen had neither the ability nor the necessary materials to keep themselves from getting lost. A sailor's ability to travel was dictated by the technology available, and it was not until the late 15th century that the development of the nautical sciences on the Iberian Peninsula allowed for the genesis of long-distance shipping by directly effecting, and leading to the creation of, new tools and techniques relative to navigation. Christopher Columbus’s famous expedition, which crossed the ocean in 1492, was arguably the first contact the civilized world had with the newly discovered continent. Financed and sponsored by Queen Isabella of Spain, his journey would open the door to new trading lanes, imperialist appetites, and the meeting of cultures. Portugal and Spain became the world's foremost leaders in deep water navigation and discovery because of their sailing expertise and the advancement of nautical sciences benefiting their ability to sail further, faster, more accurately, and safer than other states. Vast amounts of precious minerals and lucrative slaves were poured into Iberian treasuries between the late 15th and mid to late 17th centuries because of Spanish and Portuguese domination of Atlantic trade routes. The golden age of Portugal and Spain was a direct result of the advancements made in navigation technology and the sciences which allowed for deep water sailing.

Developments in nautical science on the Iberian Peninsula contributed to European transoceanic navigation during the fifteenth and sixteenth centuries. Navigators, including Christopher Columbus, used available instruments and established techniques to plan and undertake Atlantic voyages. Improvements to navigational knowledge, methods and equipment influenced the development of long-distance maritime travel.

== The influence of Prince Henry the Navigator ==
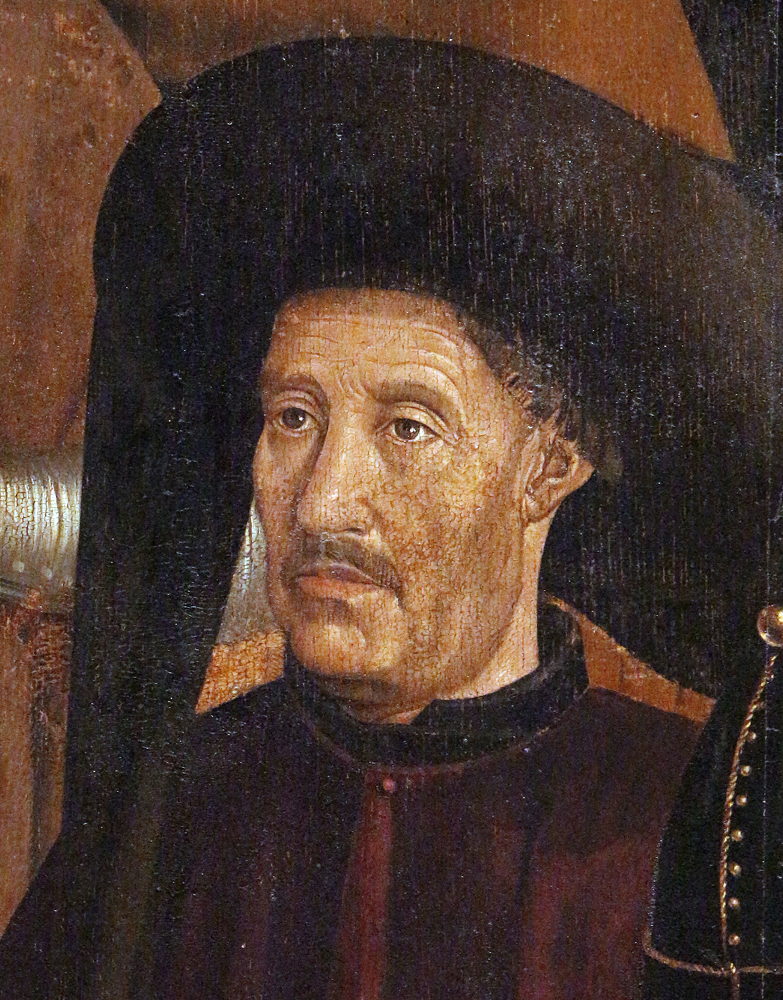
Portuguese infante and patron of the Portuguese exploration

Prior to the 14th century, navigation by European sailors was a crude imitation of what was to come. The technology available was not suitable for anything more ambitious than coast hugging voyages to known landmasses. Captains were limited to technology developed centuries earlier, like the kamal of Arabian genesis, a crude instrument used to measure latitude, and ships with designs which prohibited their use due to the crushing swells, turbulent weather, and material attrition of an open ocean expedition. It was not until Prince Henry the Navigator of Portugal was born in 1394 and gained influence at court through the 15th century that exploration and the development of nautical sciences became priorities under the Iberian governments. Having been part of the campaign to capture Ceuta as a young man, Henry's world became ever larger as he traveled the world under the banner of Christ. Even though a zealous and sometimes violent Christian, he did not disregard tales he had heard of Arabian exploration and lands beyond what was known. He had heard about the voyages of Abufeda and Albyruny, two Arabian geographers, and their recollections of travel along the western coast of Africa and began to wonder where the continents of Europe and Africa ended. The prince's mind was constantly intrigued. Henry wished to know how far the Muslim territories in Africa extended, and whether it was possible for him to reach the Orient by sea, both due to his desire to capitalize on the lucrative spice trade and pro-catholic sentiment. Upon returning to Portugal, it was clear that his travels imprinted upon Henry the desire for further exploration and discovery, along with a desire to find a land “free of the Saracen”, which soon became clear as he took a more visible role in his father's court.

Prince Henry the Navigator's overwhelming desire to expand his knowledge of the known world directly led to the advancement of the nautical sciences. Having traveled extensively, it was not revelatory knowledge that the ships and tools available would not be adequate in order to fulfill expansionist and exploratory desires. He realized that his efforts would only be benefited by becoming an expert in, and patron of, the sciences. According to Martins, “He was a true scientist. He spent whole days and nights studying, experimenting … not speculating on the vague fanciful theories of theology or metaphysics, but seeking ever after … facts which could be applied to the everyday things of life.” Reportedly he also lavished gifts upon visitors to court in the hopes of obtaining mysteries of navigation, seamanship, and knowledge of other countries.

== The town of a prince ==
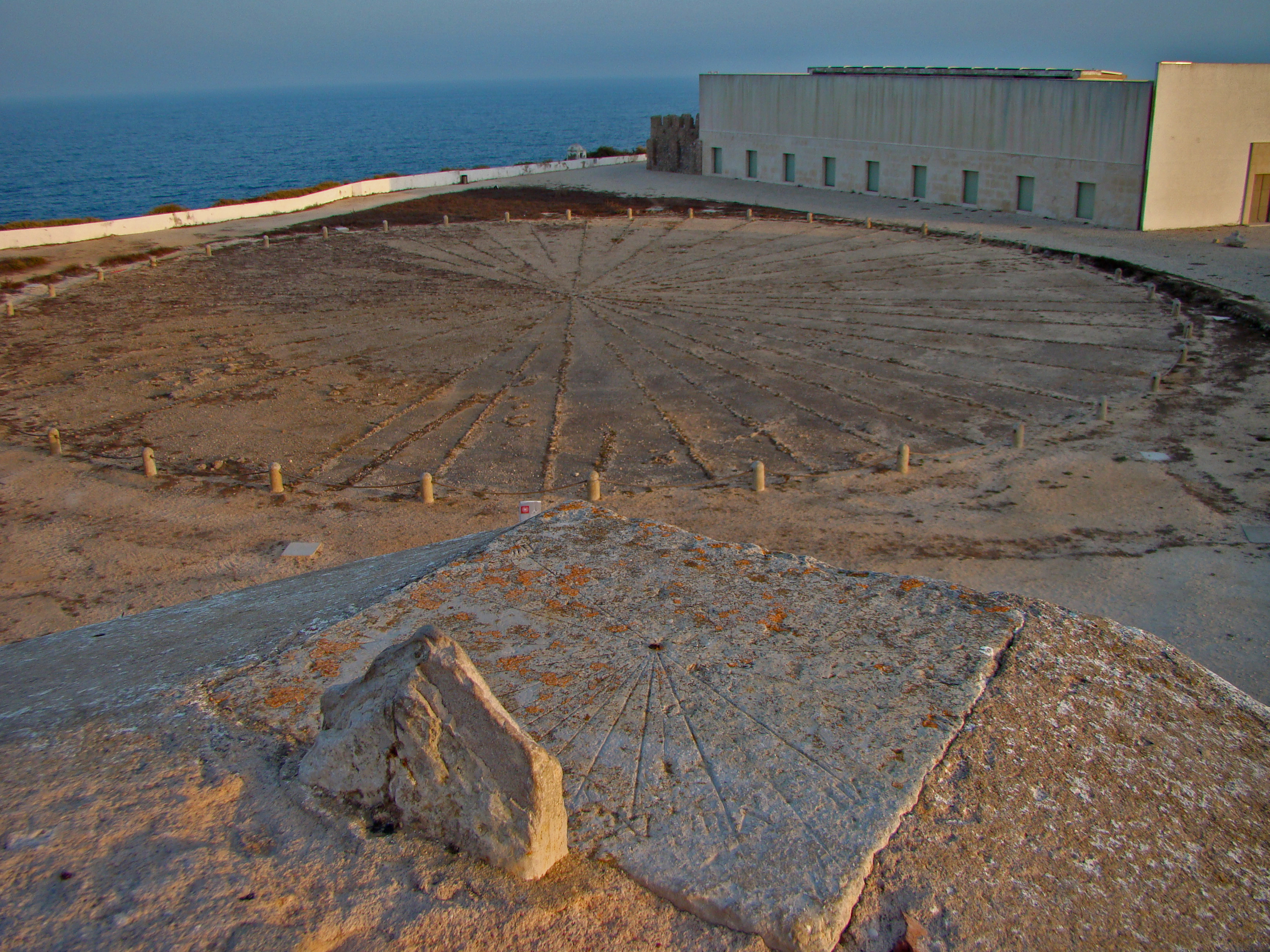
The so-called 'wind rose' at Sagres.

Eventually founding a town on the extreme southwest coast at Cape St. Vincent which came to be called the Vila do Infante, or the Prince's Town, Henry attempted to concentrate the available nautical knowledge. Anchored in an area that seemed the gateway to the sea, the town was situated with the strait of Gibraltar to its south, the Mediterranean to its east, and the vast emptiness of the Atlantic to the west. It was a perfect harbor within which to nurse the fledgling ideas of the age of exploration; the claim that the first rudimentary school for nautical navigation was located here is an invention of later centuries and has been debunked by Portuguese historians long ago. The dedication he had towards expanding the available knowledge, techniques, and tools available for exploration brought imperialist desires to the forefront of most major powers’ agenda and catalyzed the age of exploration, trade, empire, and cultural interaction that would follow.

During the time of Prince Henry and the following centuries, nautical science became the focus of many of Europe's most prominent experts in mathematics, astronomy, geography, meteorology, and physics. By applying their specific areas of expertise to the problems of seafaring navigation, many of the statutes of sailing and precursors to modern navigation were born. Up until the late 15th century, the most a sailor could rely on was his compass pointing north and experience. More accurate tools were not needed until the use of the caravel, a speedy vessel ideally suited to the ocean, became widespread. As sea travel became increasingly more important, sailors understood that the farther from coast they ventured, the more they would have to deal with currents, wind intensity and direction, star position based upon hemisphere, ship direction and speed. The problems presented to exploration by the constantly shifting, always dangerous, and vastly infinite nature of the world's oceans were confronted and overcome by the development and application of nautical science.

== The cross-staff ==
A pre-existing instrument was the cross-staff. The first working version of a cross-staff was developed for astronomical study in the 14th century and was later converted to nautical use in the early 16th century. Due its construction, the cross-staff was a cruciform piece of wood. A sailor or astronomer would put the lower edge of the traverse piece to their eye and the upper end to the position of the celestial object. Markings along the staff represented degrees of measurement which could eventually be used to obtain latitude. But the damaging effects looking directly at the sun for extended periods of time coupled with the varied nature of a ship's deck while under sail made it a very crude and unreliable instrument to work with. The lack of reliable instruments with which to determine location hindered the efforts of sailors and explorers until the later emergence of more advanced apparatuses.

The more difficult part of celestial navigation was determining longitude; that problem was only resolved sufficiently in the 18th century. Early exploration therefore was restricted to using latitude as can be seen in latitude tables in early Portuguese nautical manuals (the socalled "Manuals" of Munich and Evora) and the data in log books ( for instance in the "roteiros" by Joao de Castro)

== The quadrant ==
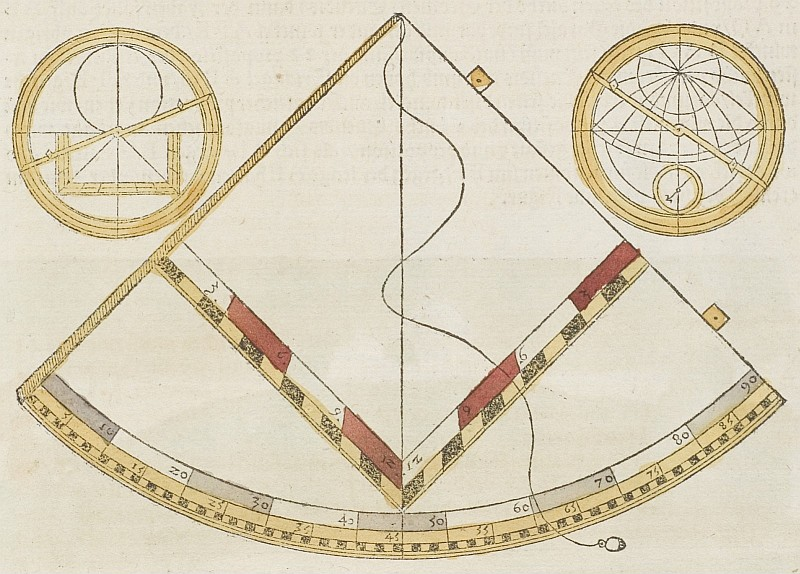
The design of a simple Mariner's Quadrant

Another latitude-measuring instrument was the quadrant. Initially the quadrant was developed as an astronomical instrument and used in land based observatories. It was described by Ptolemy in the 1st century AD and later and used by Arab astronomers. In its later shape it consisted of either a wood or brass quarter circle with degrees marked along its lower edge; a length of string was attached to the upper point to serve as a plumb bob. The celestial object was then sighted through two sighting holes at the tip and the bottom and its height read off from the mark where the plumb bob passed the lower edge. Its nautical use must have started in the late 15th century; it is mentioned in the so-called "Diario" of Columbus.

== The Mariner's astrolabe ==
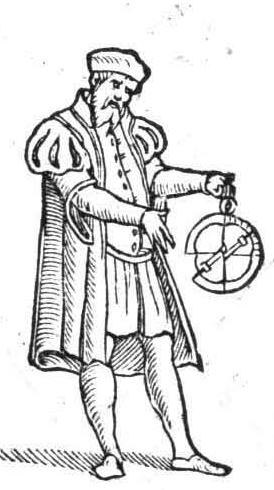

The mariner's astrolabe also measured the altitude of celestial bodies; it was developed from the so-called planispheric astrolabe, an analogue computer to solve a set of astronomical problems. In contrast with the planispheric astrolabe the Mariner's astrolabe cannot perform calculations but only be used to obtain the height of a celestial object, ordinarily the sun because sighting stars or planets is practically impossible through the small sighting holes.

Whereas the planispheric astrolabe stems from antiquity the Mariner's Astrolabe was first depicted in a manuscript of 1517; the inventory of Magellan's voyage mentions several astrolabes made of wood and metal as well as wood. The instrument was discussed in all navigation manuals beginning in the mid-16th through the 17th century; it lost its prominent place in celestial navigation when the cross staff and the Davis quadrant gained general acceptance.

According to a census of 2018 more than 100 astrolabes are preserved, most of them salvaged from wrecks. Of these most are of Portuguese and Spanish ships that were lost on voyages to and from the East Indies (Portuguese) and the Spanish Main.

== Pedro Nunes ==
The Portuguese mathematician Pedro Nunes published important treatises on navigation (Tratado da sphera com a Theorica do Sol e da Lua, 1537; De Arte Atque Ratione Navigandi Libri Duo, 1573). Born at the outset of the 16th century, he applied much of his life to improving the mathematics of navigation. He was the first to give a drawing showing loxodromes but gave no mathematical explanation for them. He also invented a device known as the nonius which was applied in a new instrument, the "instrumento de sombras". Later in life he was invited to court by King John III of Portugal and was named Royal Cosmographer in 1529.

== Abraham Zacuto and the ephemerides ==
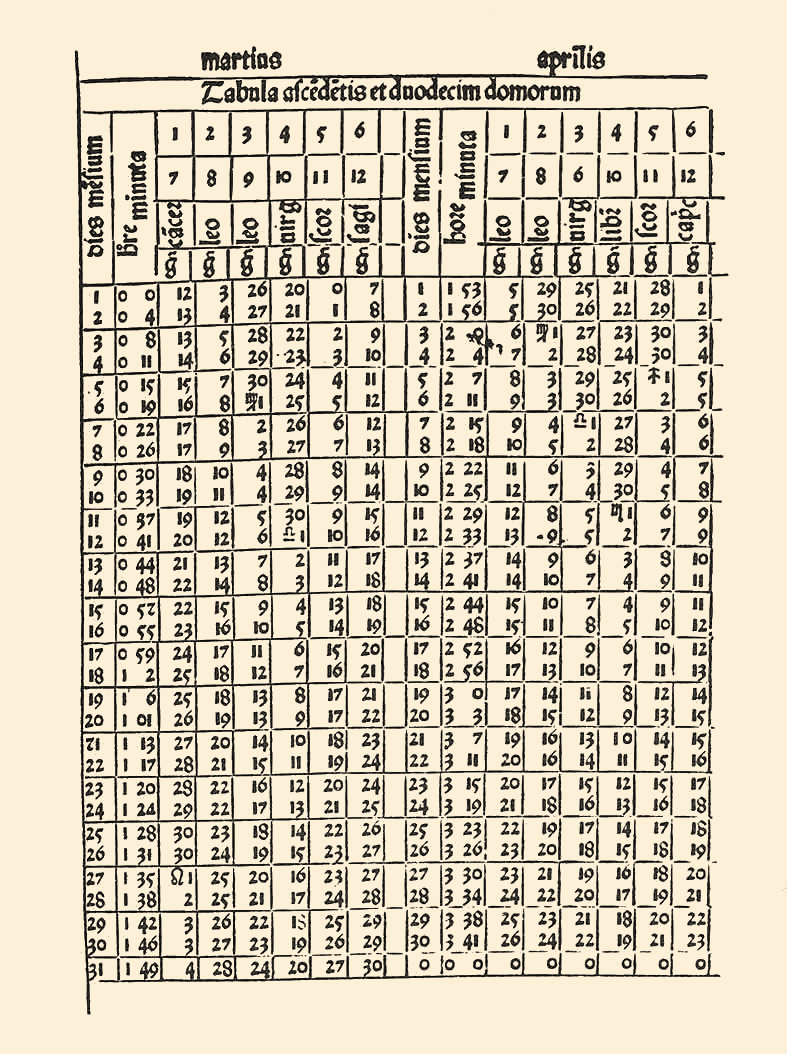
Page from Almanach Perpetuum.

Once out of sight of the coast, Portuguese and Spanish ship pilots could rely upon the astrolabe and quadrant to determine their location on a north–south reference, however longitude was noticeably more difficult to acquire. The problem was time. Out on the vast stretches of the ocean, it is very difficult to keep track of time once leaving port. In order to calculate longitude a sailor would need to know the time difference between his current location and a fixed point somewhere on earth, usually the port of call. Even if one could determine the time of day while in deep waters, they still needed to know the time at their home port. The answer was the ephemerides, astronomical charts plotting the location of the stars over a distinct period of time. The German astronomer Regiomontanus published an accurate day-to-day Ephemerides in 1474. Published in 1496 by the Jewish astronomer, astrologer, and mathematician Abraham Zacuto, the Almanach Perpetuum included tables for the movements of stars. Through the use of an astrolabe, also perfected by Zacuto who advanced it from a crude wooden tool to an accurate brass instrument, sailors could determine the time at home. Zacuto himself was born in Spain in 1451 and took refuge in Lisbon during the expulsion of the Jews. He eventually was invited by King John II of Portugal, much like Pedro Nunes, to become the Royal Astronomer, a position he accepted and used to promote exploration, particularly investigating a sea route to India.

== The nocturnal ==
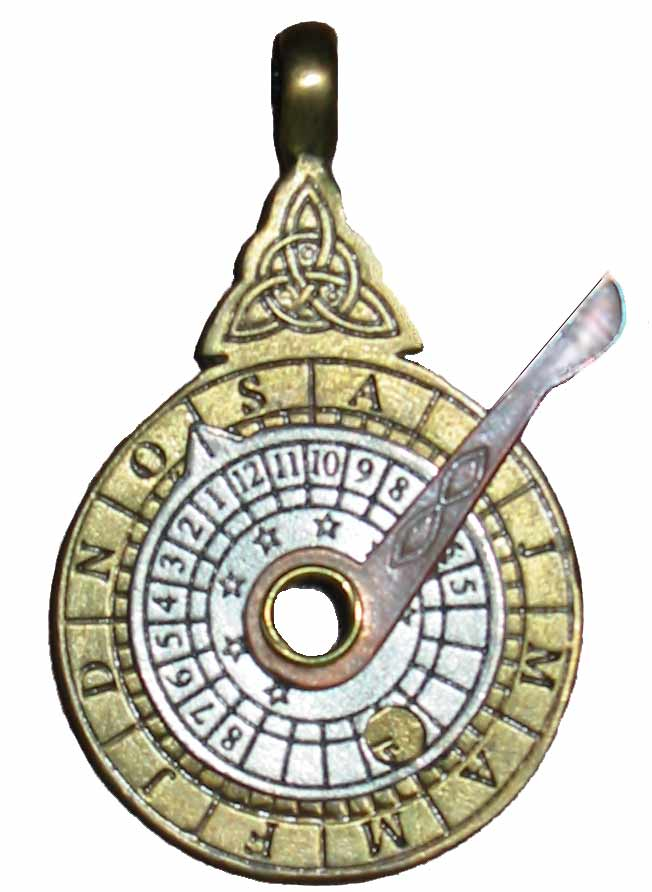
A nocturnal as costume jewellery. This is a functioning nocturnal, though only about 5 cm tall. It shows the month ring on the outside in brass. The silver colored inner disk shows the time and has an indicator on one edge.

The nocturnal was used to find the time at night using the north star. The observer would look through the central hole and align the movable arm with certain stars (the "guardas") of the Little Bear. The time could then be read at the outer rim. It was probably first described by Raimundud Lullius at the end of the 13th century; Peter Apian depicted it in 1514 in his "Cosmographicus Liber", so did Sebastian Mübster in 1537 in "Fürmalung und künstliche Bescheibung der Horologien (1537). Martín Cortés showed the nocturlabe for the first time in a nautical manual. There are many instruments preserved in museums and private collections which indicates its widespread use before the advent of more reliable time keepers.

== Conclusion ==
However, none of these developments could have come about without a vigorous support of the sciences and the breakthroughs of numerous academics well versed in mathematics, physics, oceanography, and astronomy. Henry the Navigator, the catalyst for Portuguese exploration and imperialism, was himself an ardent and zealous student of the sciences. He may have invited cartographers and astronomers to Sagres in order to improve the science of navigation. The caravel and its deep water design rose to prominence under his patronage of the sciences and exploration. The court of his father was flooded with foreigners enticed by Henry and his appetite for any secrets of navigation they could provide. Although driven by religious motivation forged during the crusades, his influence on Portuguese exploration and patronage of nautical sciences is without doubt. Martín Cortés de Albacar and Abraham Zacuto both published works in the 16th century that became backbones for naval instruction through the end of the 19th century. Cortes's work included detailed instructions on how to both construct and apply an astrolabe while Zacuto's Almanach and the ephemerides published within were critical to the use of a nocturnal, notably by both Vasco da Gama and Pedro Álvares Cabral.

Without the advancements made in nautical sciences, particularly by Iberian scientists and explorers, trans-oceanic navigation would have not been possible. The earliest periods of navigation within Portugal and Spain employed the use of crude, antiquated, and unreliable instruments. The kamal and cross-staff, while both useful, lacked the ability to be consistently practically applied on board a ship. They were replaced by the trigonometric quadrant and its semi-circle construction. But even that was unreliable at times because a pilot would need calm waters in order to acquire a reading. Eventually it was used together with the astrolabe, which became a critical piece of equipment for navigation after Martín Cortés de Albacar published his Art. Because it could be used day or night, in rough or calm seas, it was cross referenced with the quadrant in order to gain the most accurate reading possible. Finally, the nocturnal and its accompanied values in the ephemerides granted sailors the ability to plot longitude on the open ocean. Navigation across vast stretches of open water was no longer merely as daunting. An expedition leader, the captains, ships, and crews could all be confident that, barring the intercession of the ocean's unpredictable nature, a course could be safely and accurately plotted from a port of call to final destination. Portugal to colonized Brazil, Spain to its holdings in Florida, the challenges of thousand mile and multiple month long excursions could be overcome. In the span of a few centuries, nautical sciences had granted man the ability to circumnavigate the globe by 1521, exploit vast reserves of untouched natural resources, open dialogue with previously unknown cultures, and open lucrative new trading routes; the world had become a much larger place.

== See also ==
- Portuguese nautical science
