= Prince Henry the Navigator Park =

Park in New Bedford, Massachusetts, U.S.

Coordinates: 41.640°N 70.914°W

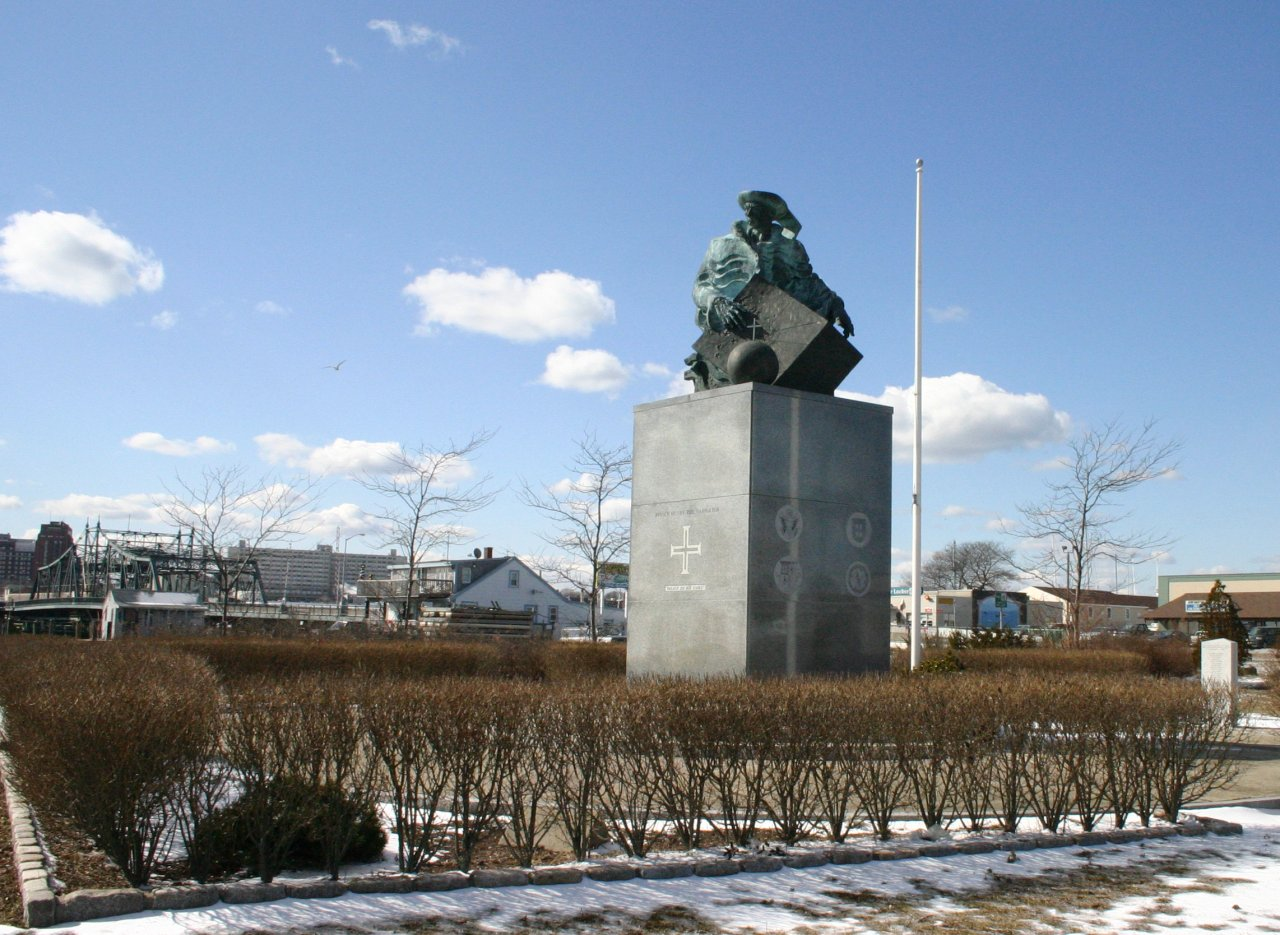
Prince Henry the Navigator Park

Prince Henry the Navigator Park is a park on Pope's Island in New Bedford, Massachusetts. The park is dedicated to Prince Henry the Navigator. It was created in 1994, a gift to the city from the Prince Henry Society of New Bedford and the Portuguese government.

The park sits between New Bedford and Fairhaven, between the fishing docks of both cities, looking out toward the hurricane barrier in the New Bedford Harbor and Buzzards Bay beyond.

The park consists of a large granite and bronze statue in tribute to Prince Henry the Navigator. There is also a stone plaque, a walkway, and a parking and viewing area from which tourists can view New Bedford harbor.
