= Prince Henry the Navigator =

Portuguese prince and governor (1394–1460)

- Duke of Viseu
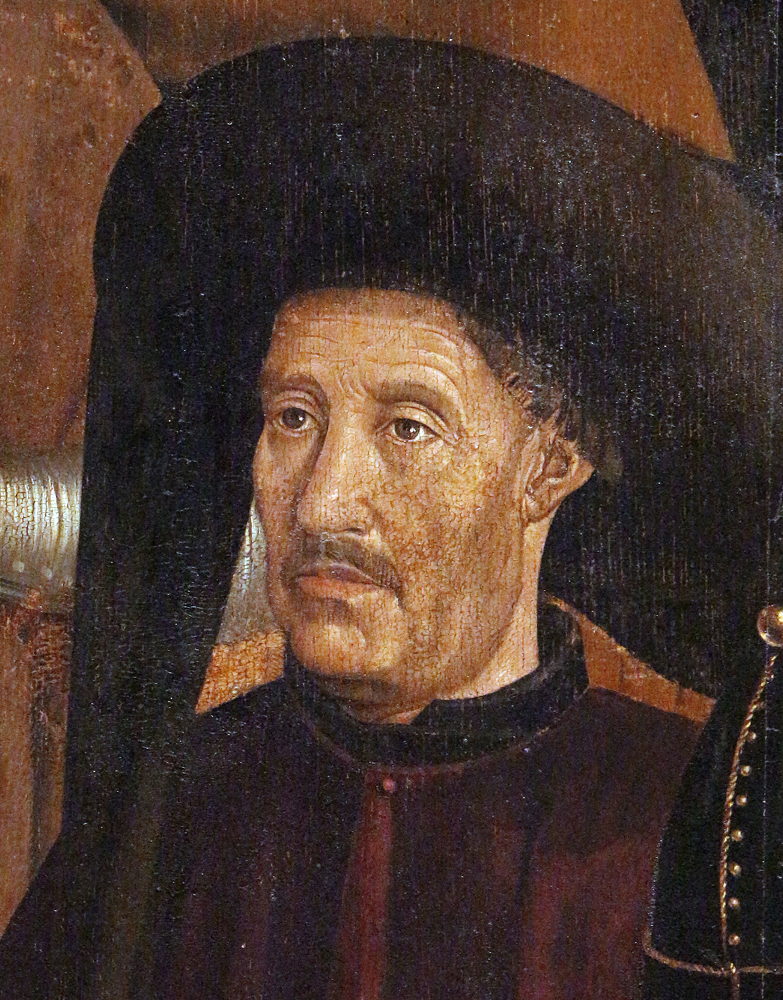
- Henry the Navigator depicted on the Saint Vincent Panels, by Nuno Gonçalves, c. 1470
- Born: 4 March 1394; Porto, Portugal
- Died: 13 November 1460 (aged 66); Sagres, Portugal
- Burial: Batalha Monastery
- House: Aviz
- Father: John I of Portugal
- Mother: Philippa of Lancaster
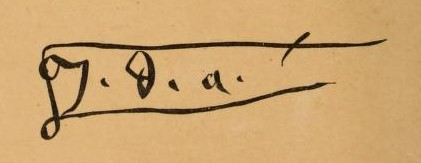
- Signature

Prince Henry the Navigator (Note: Portuguese: Infante Dom Henrique, formally Prince Henry of Portugal, Duke of Viseu) (4 March 1394 – 13 November 1460), was a Portuguese prince, a central figure in the early days of the Portuguese Empire and often credited as one of the main initiators of the Age of Discovery. Henry was the third child of King John I of Portugal, who founded the House of Aviz.

Utilising the new caravel ship, Henry directed the early development of Portuguese exploration and maritime trade with other continents through the systematic exploration of Western Africa, the islands of the Atlantic Ocean, and the search for new routes. He supported his father in the 1415 conquest of Ceuta, a Muslim port on the North African coast across the Straits of Gibraltar from the Iberian Peninsula. Regarded as the patron of Portuguese discoveries, he died on 13 November 1460 in Vila do Bispo in the Algarve.

== Early life ==
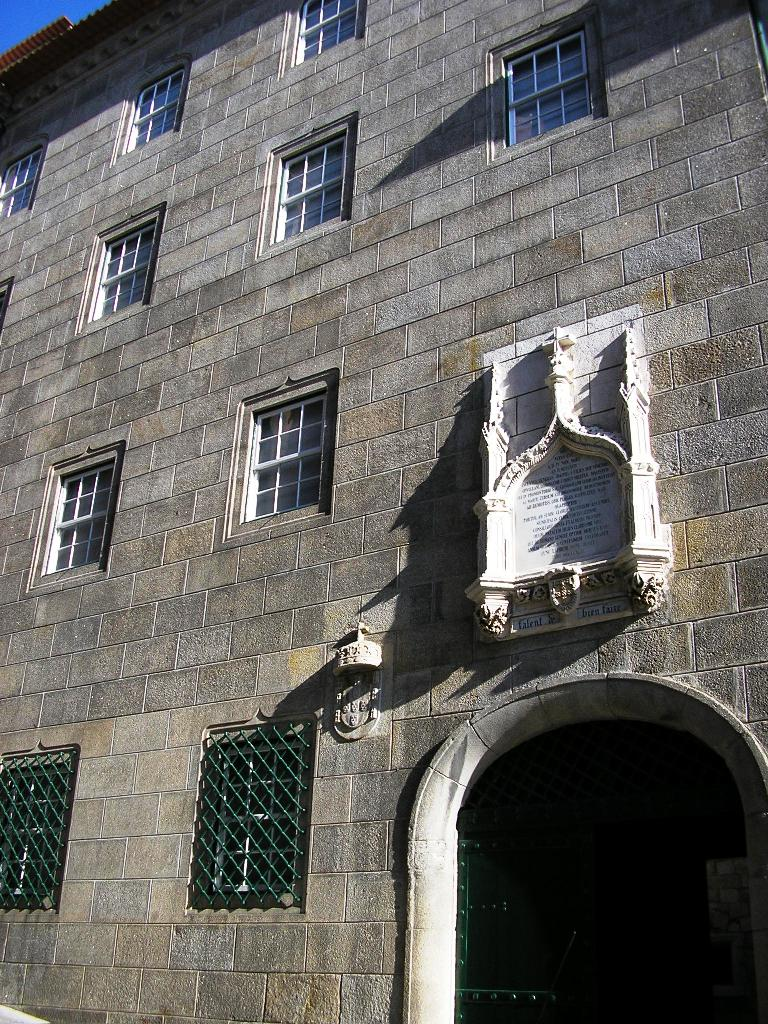
The Casa do Infante, in Porto, is traditionally considered Prince Henry's birthplace.

Henry was the third surviving son of King John I and his wife Philippa, sister of King Henry IV of England. He was baptized in Porto, and may have been born there, probably when the royal couple was living in the city's old mint, now called Casa do Infante (Prince's House), or in the region nearby. Another possibility is that he was born at the Monastery of Leça do Balio, in Leça da Palmeira, during the same period of the royal couple's residence in the city of Porto.

As early as 1410 or 1412, Henry had commissioned his captains to explore the coasts beyond Cape Non, which was considered the limit of the known and charted world in Europe together with Cape Bojador. Little is known of these expeditions, however.

=== The conquest of Ceuta, 1415 ===
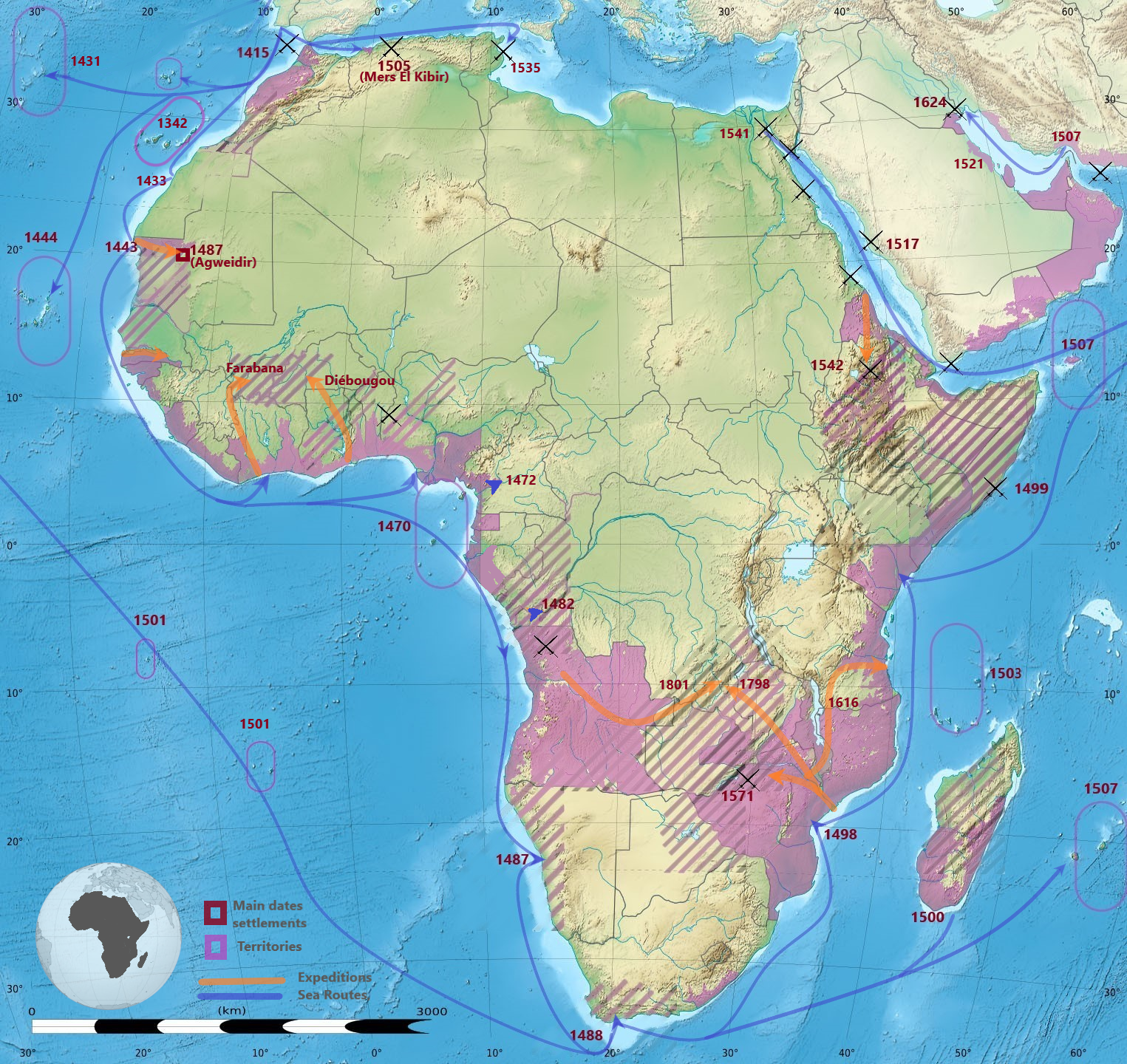
Portuguese presence and exploration in Africa and middle east -1415 - 1801

Henry was 21 when he participated in an expedition to capture the Moorish port city of Ceuta in northern Morocco. Henry was made responsible for recruiting troops and ships in northern Portugal and assemble them at Porto before joining the main fleet en route to Ceuta. At Ceuta, he anchored his ships off the lower part of the town, and on the 15th of August king John rowed through the fleet to inspect it as the attack was to take place the following morning. Henry was said to have claimed and been granted the right to be the first to land. The quays were expected to be devoid of defenders as the main force would be brought up against the citadel to divert the defenders.

The following morning a number of volunteers rushed ashore, one Ruy Gonçalves being recorded as the first to land, and Henry followed along with Edward. After a struggle the Muslims were driven from the landing grounds to the city walls. The Portuguese breached into Ceuta but Henry did not allow his squadron of men to rush inside. He kept them by the gates and sent for reinforcements, which were quickly brought up led by Fernandes de Ataíde, who cheered them on. He advanced into urban combat in narrow streets, but eventually the Muslims were routed. The Portuguese scattered for plunder, risked losing the city in a counterattack. Henry's squadron broke a Muslim rally twice, and with seventeen men held a gate on the inner wall between the lower town and the high citadel. Contact was lost between Henry, Peter and the main Portuguese force, and they were reported dead to King John I, though both were found alive towards the evening. Henry held a council with his brothers Edward and Peter, all deciding to assault the citadel the following morning, but after sunset scouts reported that almost all defenders had already evacuated, and the citadel surrendered.

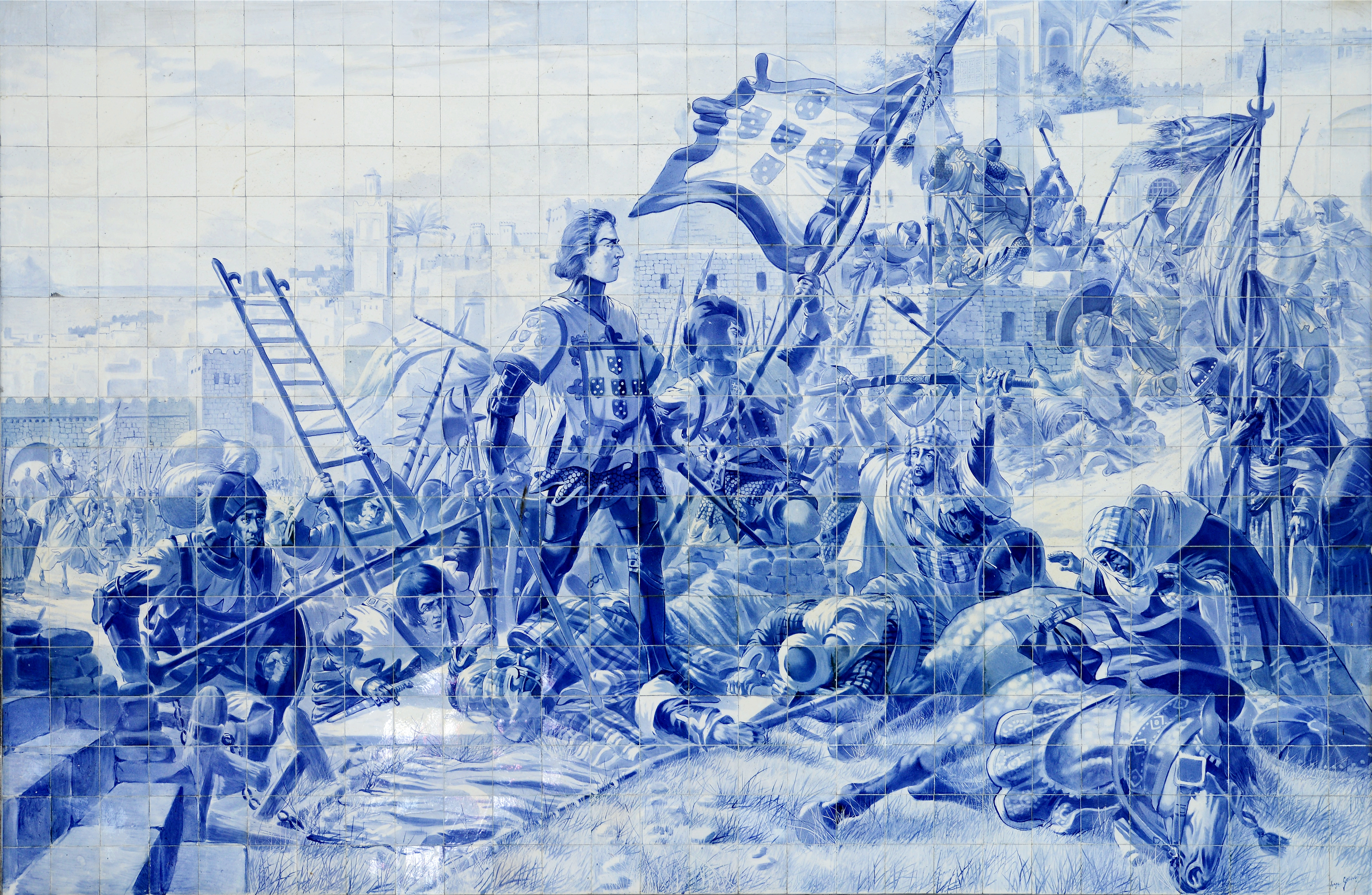
Prince Henry at the 1415 Conquest of Ceuta, considered the beginning of the Portuguese Empire.

Henry was knighted at Ceuta along with his two brothers by King John, who also made them dukes, the first time this title was employed in Portugal. Henry was made Duke of Viseu, appointed governor of the Order of Christ, and made responsible for the provisioning of the newly captured city. Henry became renowned throughout Europe after the capture of Ceuta, and he was invited by the Pope, the Holy Roman Emperor and the kings of Castile and England to command their armies.

Following this success, in 1416 Prince Peter left for a grand tour across Europe, and his travels were instrumental in stimulating the efforts of his brother Henry. His first destination was the Holy Land. From there Pedro proceeded to the Ottoman court, Babylon, where he was afforded a grand reception, and from there moved on to Rome, where he met Pope Martin V. He also visited Hungary, Denmark and Venice, where he was gifted by the republic a copy of the Travels of Marco Polo, together with a map thought to have been made by Polo himself. He then travelled to England, where he was elected Knight of the Garter on the 22nd of April 1427, and returned to Portugal the following year.

=== Relief of Ceuta, 1418 ===
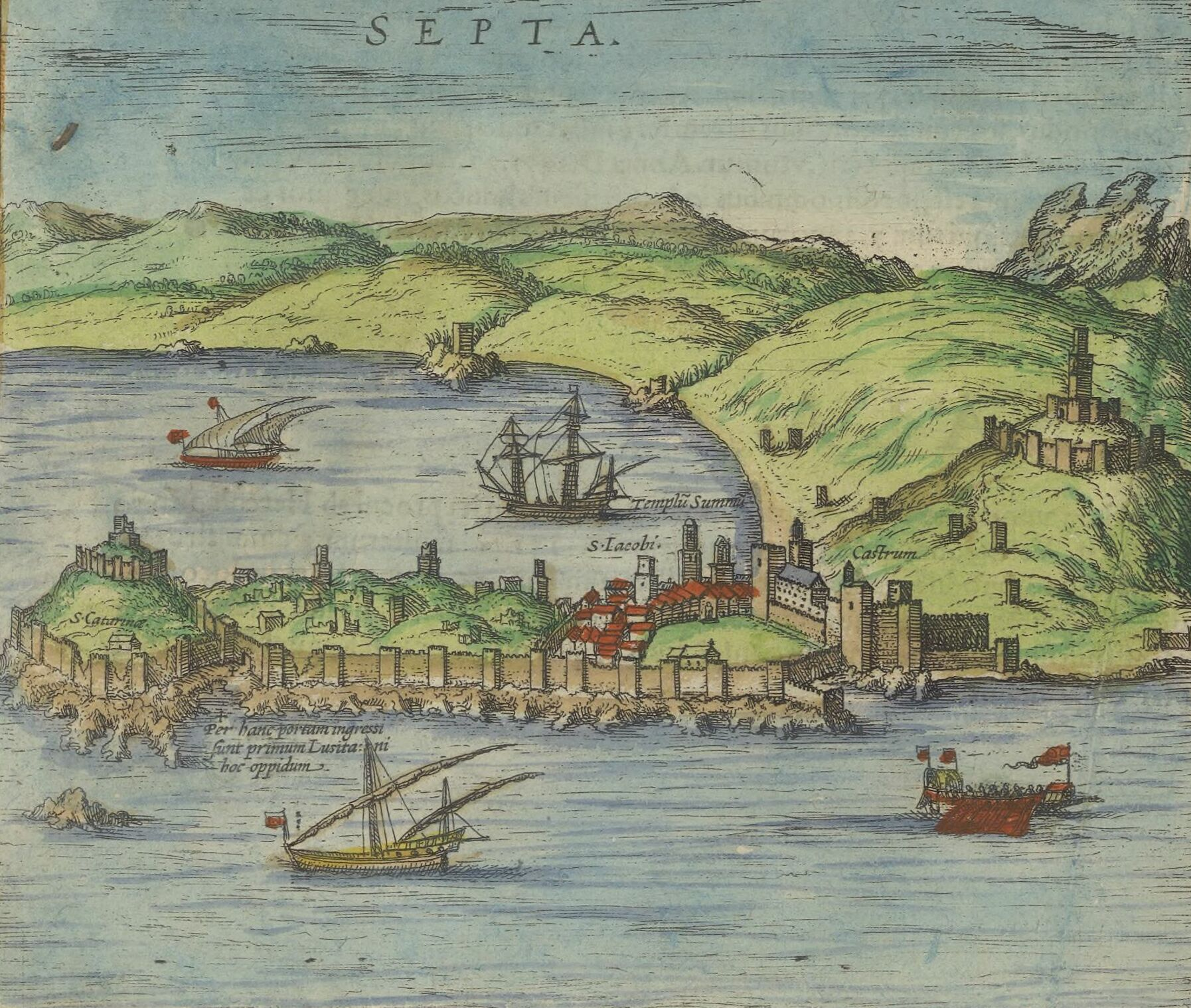
Ceuta in 1572.

Three years after the conquest of Ceuta, the emir of Granada and the sultan of Fez joined forces to besiege Ceuta by land and sea. The ruler of Granada sent seventy four ships, while the forces of Fez managed to breach into the lower town. The governor of Ceuta Dom Pedro de Meneses dispatched to Portugal a request for aid and Henry was sent to organize a relief expedition from Lisbon, while Edward and Pedro prepared to follow him from Lagos and the rest of the Algarve if need be. The Muslims secured Almina while the galleys of Granada closed in upon the port in the meantime. As the relief fleet commanded by Henry crossed the Straits of Gibraltar it received news of the dire situation in the city. However the sight of the approaching fleet caused panic among the besiegers and by the time it finally reached Ceuta most of the Muslims had already withdrawn.

Henry remained at Ceuta with his forces for two months. While there he planned an attack on Gibraltar on the way to Portugal, but a storm scattered the fleet and the attack was called off. Both expeditions to Ceuta in 1415 and 1418 allowed Henry to gather intelligence on the lands to the south, obtained mainly from Muslim prisoners. They included "news of the passage of merchants from the coasts of Tunis to Timbuctoo and to Cantor on the Gambia, which inspired him to seek the lands by the way of the sea" but also information of "certain tall palms growing at the mouth of the Senegal", obtained from Sanhaja, referred to as "tawny moors" or Azenegues by the Portuguese.

In 1419, Henry's father appointed him governor of the province of the Algarve.

== Resources and income ==
Coat of arms of Prince Henry as Duke of Viseu.

On May 25, 1420, Henry gained appointment as the administrator of the Order of Christ, the Portuguese successor to the Knights Templar, which had its headquarters at Tomar in central Portugal. Henry held this position for the remainder of his life, and the Order was an important source of funds for his ambitious plans, especially his persistent attempts to conquer the Canary Islands, which the Portuguese had claimed to have discovered before the year 1346.

Prince Peter, Duke of Coimbra, had set out on a diplomatic tour of Europe, with an additional charge from Henry to seek out geographic material. Peter returned in 1426 with a world map from Venice.

In 1431, Henry donated houses for the Estudo Geral to teach all the sciences—grammar, logic, rhetoric, arithmetic, music, and astronomy—in what would later become the University of Lisbon. For other subjects like medicine or philosophy, he ordered that each room should be decorated according to the subject taught.

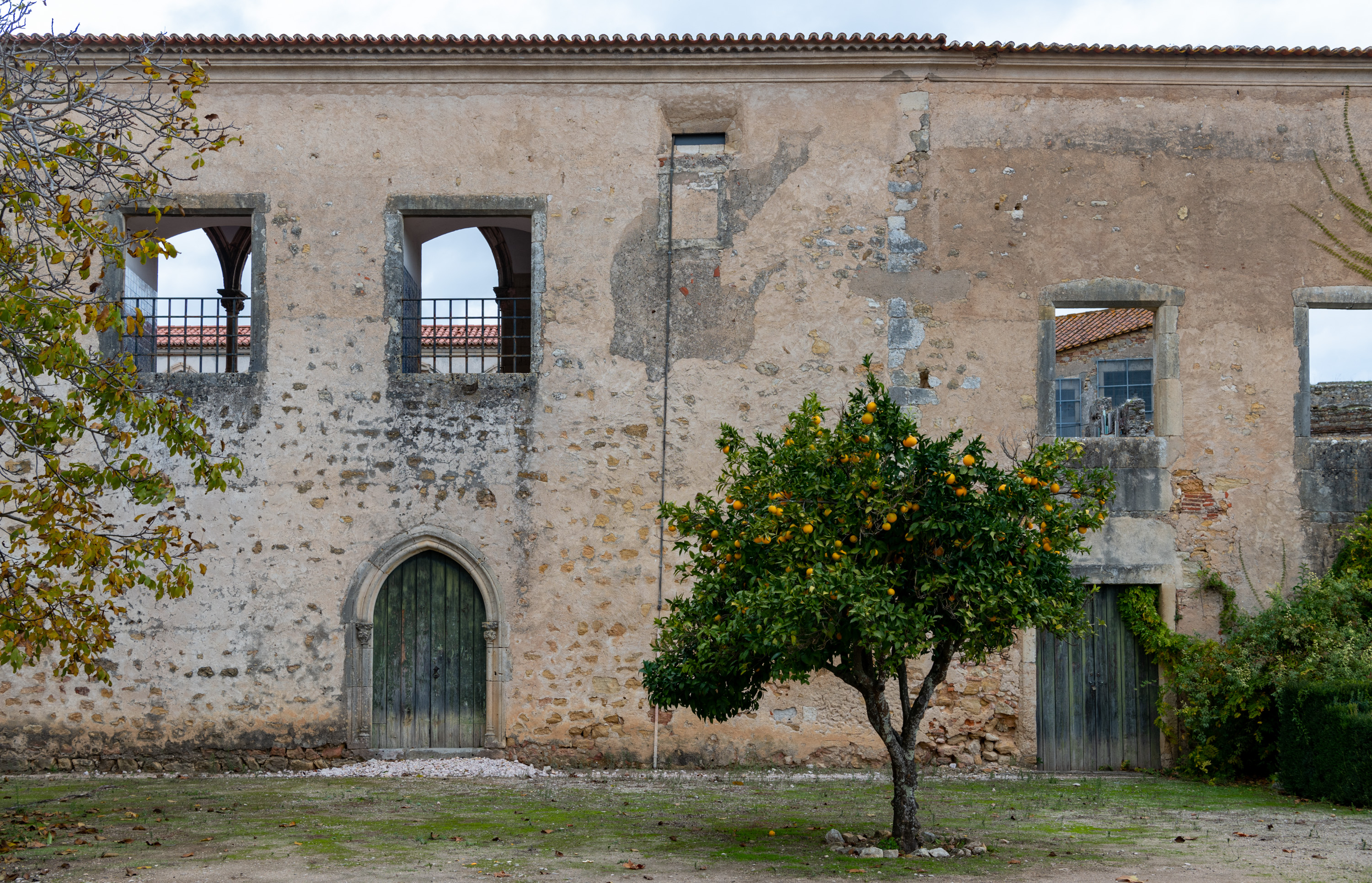
Prince Henry ordered construction of the Paços Henriquinos (Henrician Palace) at the Convent of Christ in Tomar, to serve as his residence when he was appointed as Governor of the Order of Christ in 1420.

Henry also had other resources. When John I died in 1433, Henry's eldest brother Edward of Portugal became king. He granted Henry all profits from trading within the areas he discovered as well as the sole right to authorize expeditions beyond Cape Bojador. Henry also held a monopoly on tuna fishing in the Algarve. When Edward died eight years later, Henry supported his brother Peter, Duke of Coimbra for the regency during the minority of Edward's son Afonso V, and in return received a confirmation of this levy.

Henry was the main organizer of the disastrous expedition to Tangier in 1437 against Salah Ben Salah, which ended in Henry's younger brother Ferdinand being given as hostage to guarantee Portuguese promises in the peace agreement. The Portuguese Cortes refused to return Ceuta as ransom for Ferdinand, who remained in captivity until his death six years later.

Prince Regent Peter supported Portuguese maritime expansion in the Atlantic Ocean and Africa. Henry promoted the colonization of the Azores during Peter's regency (1439–1448). For most of the latter part of his life, Henry concentrated on his maritime activities and court politics.

== Vila do Infante and Portuguese exploration ==
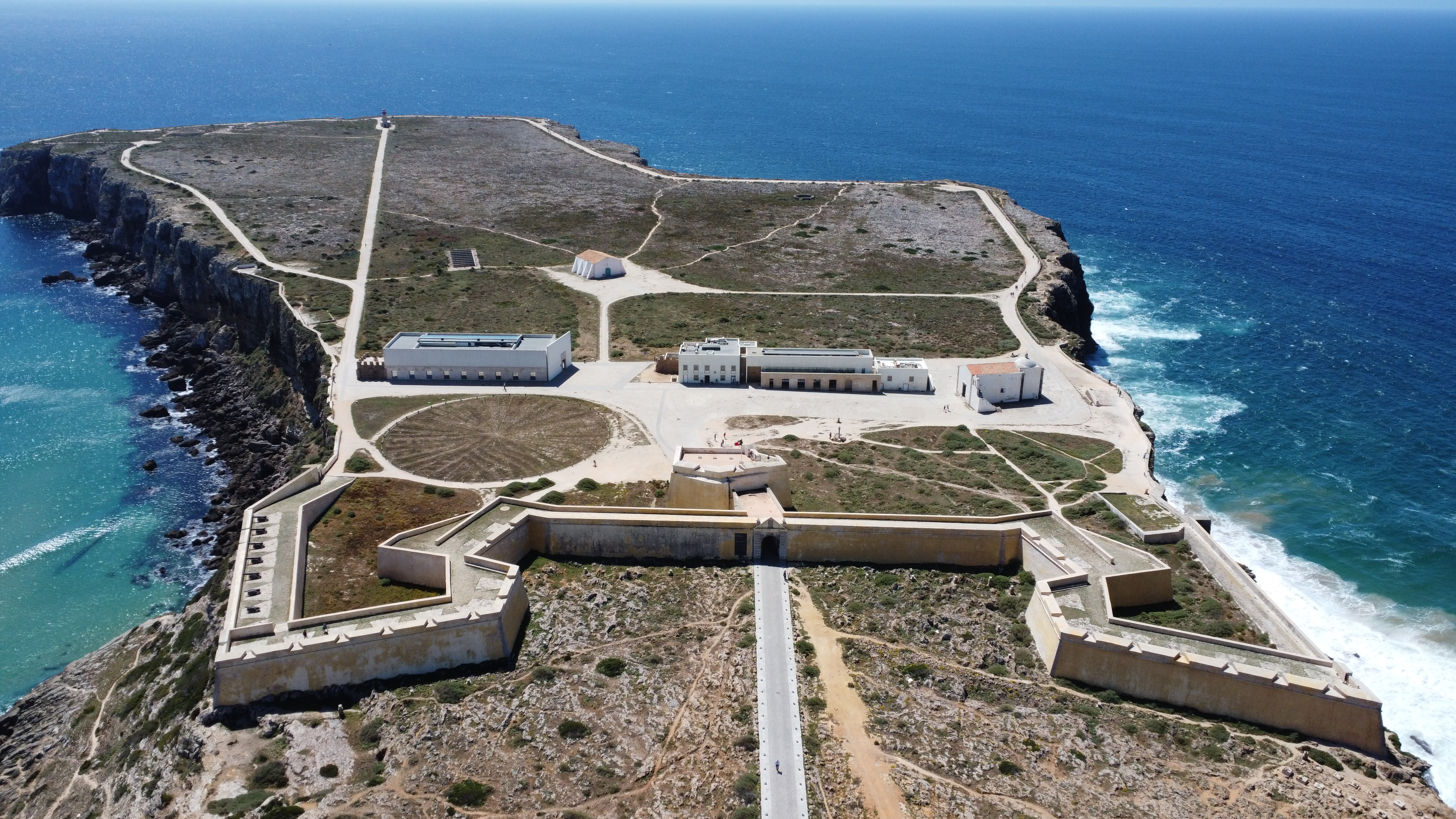
The Fortress of Sagres, near Cape St. Vincent in the Algarve, is said to have been the seat of the legendary Sagres school.

According to João de Barros, in Algarve, Prince Henry the Navigator repopulated a village that he called Terçanabal (from terça nabal or tercena nabal). This village was situated in a strategic position for his maritime enterprises and was later called Vila do Infante ("Estate or Town of the Prince").

It is traditionally suggested that Henry gathered at his villa on the Sagres peninsula a school of navigators and cartographers. However modern historians hold this to be a misconception. He did employ some cartographers to chart the coast of Mauritania after the voyages he sent there, but there was no center of navigation science or observatory in the modern sense of the word, nor was there an organized navigational center.

Referring to Sagres, sixteenth-century Portuguese mathematician and cosmographer Pedro Nunes remarked, "from it our sailors went out well taught and provided with instruments and rules which all map makers and navigators should know."

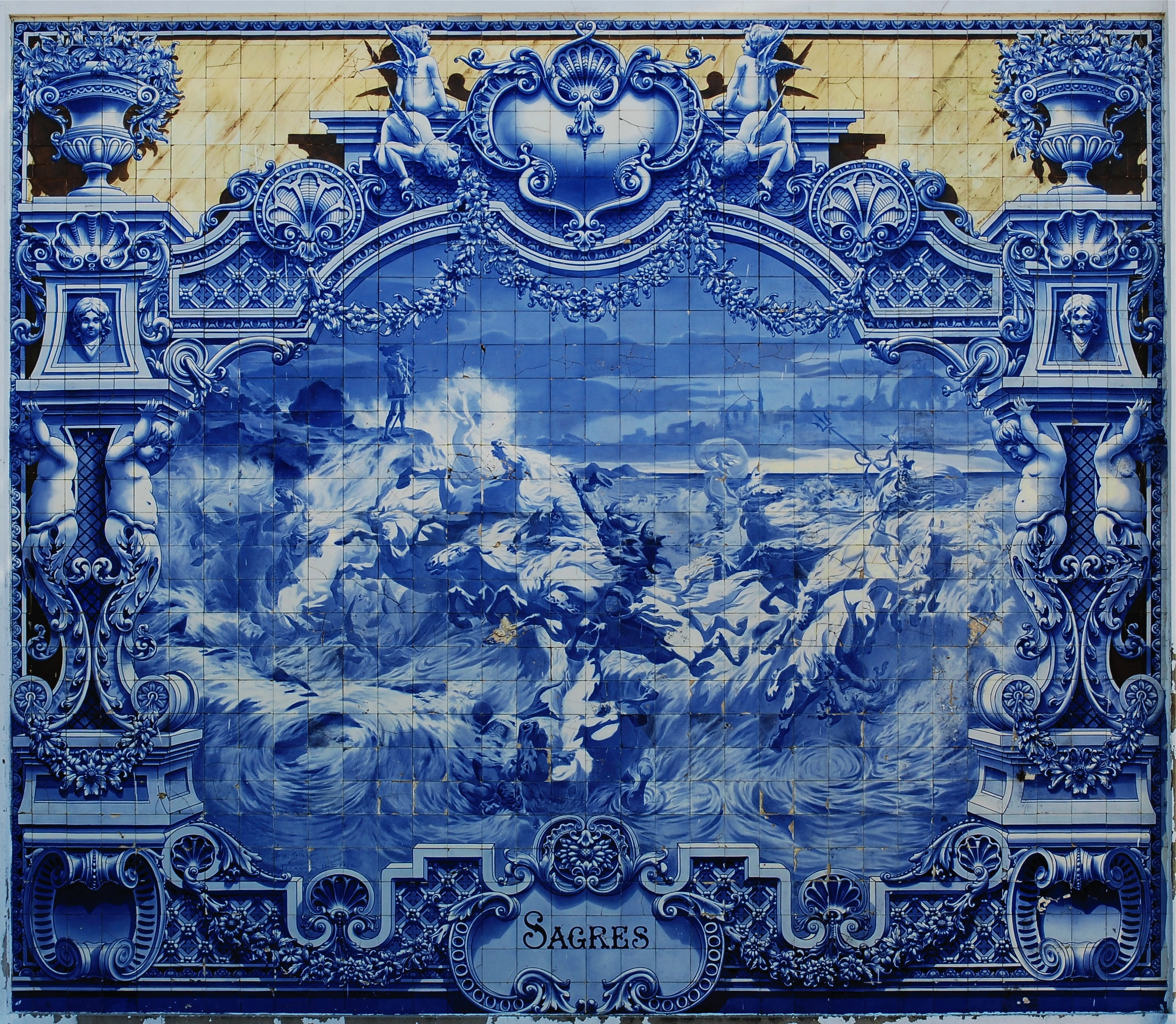
"Sagres". Monumental allegorical azulejos tile panel in Lisbon dedicated to Prince Henry.

The view that Henry's court rapidly grew into the technological base for exploration, with a naval arsenal and an observatory, etc., although repeated in popular culture, has never been established. Henry did possess geographical curiosity, and employed cartographers. Jehuda Cresques, a noted cartographer, has been said to have accepted an invitation to come to Portugal to make maps for the infante. Prestage makes the argument that the presence of the latter at the Prince's court "probably accounts for the legend of the School of Sagres, which is now discredited."

== Henry's explorations ==
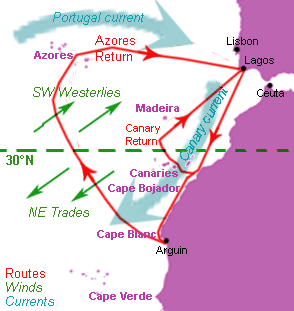
Map depicting Atlantic winds (green), currents (blue) and approximate Portuguese sailing routes (red) utilizing the Volta do mar technique, perfected under Prince Henry.

Henry began to explore the coast of Africa, most of which was unknown to Europeans. His objectives included finding the source of the West African gold trade and the legendary Christian kingdom of Prester John, and stopping the pirate attacks on the Portuguese coast.

At that time, the cargo ships of the Mediterranean were too slow and heavy to undertake such voyages. Under Henry's direction, a new and much lighter ship was developed, the caravel, which could sail farther and faster. Above all, it was highly maneuverable and could sail "into the wind", making it largely independent of the prevailing winds. The caravel used the lateen sail, the prevailing rig in Christian Mediterranean navigation since late antiquity. With this ship, Portuguese mariners freely explored uncharted waters around the Atlantic, from rivers and shallow waters to transoceanic voyages.

Henry sponsored voyages, collecting a 20% tax (o quinto) on profits, the usual practice in the Iberian states at the time. The nearby port of Lagos provided a convenient home port for these expeditions. The voyages were made in very small ships, mostly the caravel, a light and maneuverable vessel equipped by lateen sails. Most of the voyages sent out by Henry consisted of one or two ships that navigated by following the coast, stopping at night to tie up along some shore.

During Prince Henry's time and after, the Portuguese navigators discovered and perfected the North Atlantic volta do mar (the "turn of the sea" or "return from the sea"): the dependable pattern of trade winds blowing largely from the east near the equator and the returning westerlies in the mid-Atlantic. This was a major step in the history of navigation, when an understanding of oceanic wind patterns was crucial to Atlantic navigation, from Africa and the open ocean to Europe, and enabled the main route between the New World and Europe in the North Atlantic in future voyages of discovery. Although the lateen sail allowed sailing upwind to some extent, it was worth even major extensions of course to have a faster and calmer following wind for most of a journey. Portuguese mariners who sailed south and southwest towards the Canary Islands and West Africa would afterwards sail far to the northwest—that is, away from continental Portugal, and seemingly in the wrong direction—before turning northeast near the Azores islands and finally east to Europe in order to have largely following winds for their full journey. Christopher Columbus used this on his transatlantic voyages.

=== Madeira ===
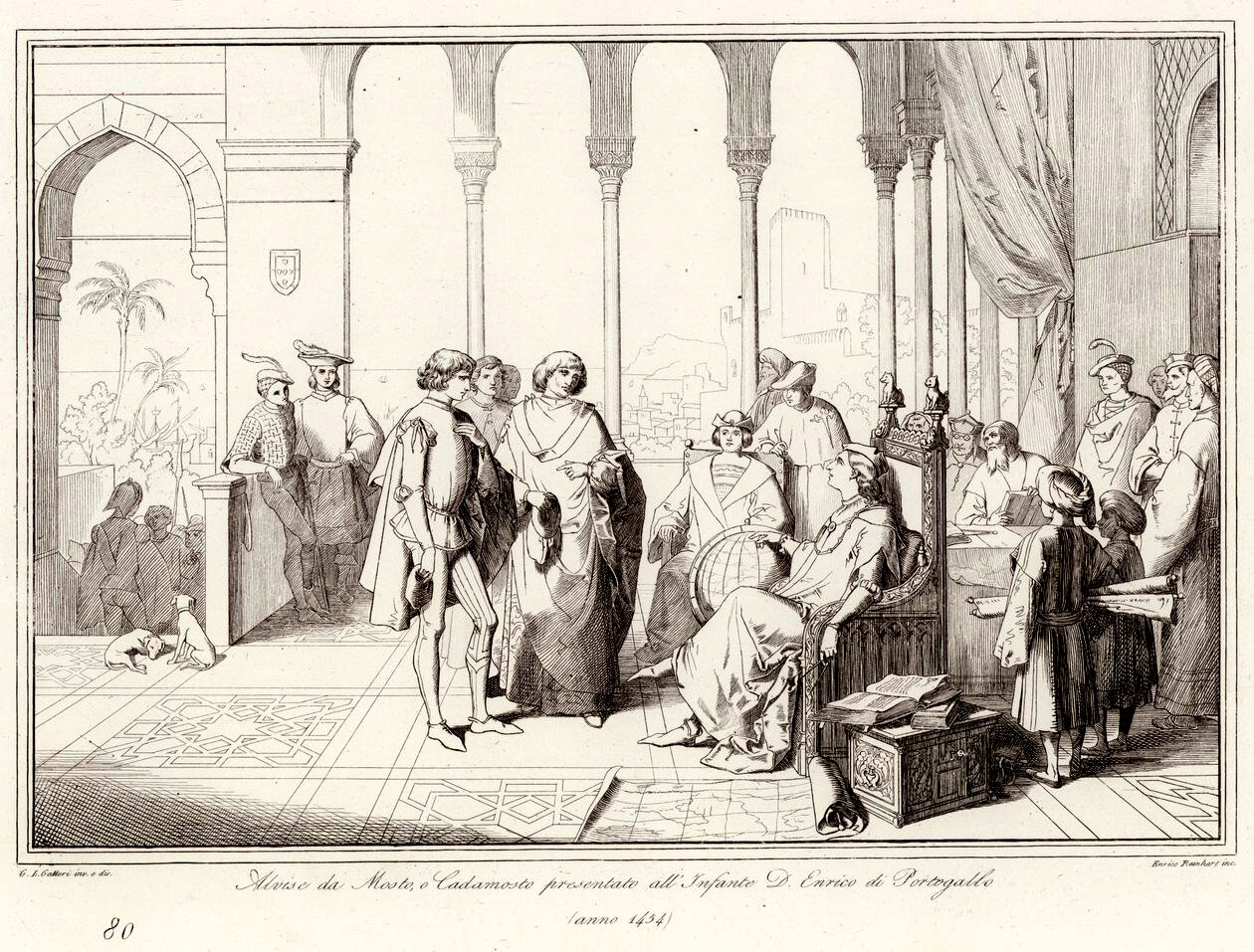
Depiction of Prince Henry enlisting Alvise Cadamosto, who led a voyage to Porto Santo, Madeira, and the Canary Islands, before reaching the African mainland.

The first explorations followed not long after the capture of Ceuta in 1415. Henry was interested in locating the source of the caravans that brought gold to the city. During the reign of his father, John I, João Gonçalves Zarco and Tristão Vaz Teixeira were sent to explore along the African coast. Zarco, a knight in service to Prince Henry, had commanded the caravels guarding the coast of Algarve from the incursions of the Moors. He had also been at Ceuta, along with his fellow companion Tristão Vaz Teixeira.

In 1418, Zarco and Teixeira were blown off-course by a storm while making the volta do mar westward swing to return to Portugal. They found shelter at an island they named Porto Santo. Henry directed that Porto Santo be colonized. The move to claim the Madeiran islands was probably a response to Castile's efforts to claim the Canary Islands. In 1420, settlers then moved to the nearby island of Madeira.

=== The Azores ===
A chart drawn by the Catalan cartographer, Gabriel de Vallseca of Mallorca, has been interpreted to indicate that the Azores were first discovered by Diogo de Silves in 1427. In 1431, Gonçalo Velho was dispatched with orders to determine the location of "islands" first identified by de Silves. Velho apparently got as far as the Formigas, in the eastern archipelago, before having to return to Sagres, probably due to bad weather.

By this time the Portuguese navigators had also reached the Sargasso Sea (western North Atlantic region), naming it after the Sargassum seaweed growing there (sargaço / sargasso in Portuguese).

=== West African coast ===
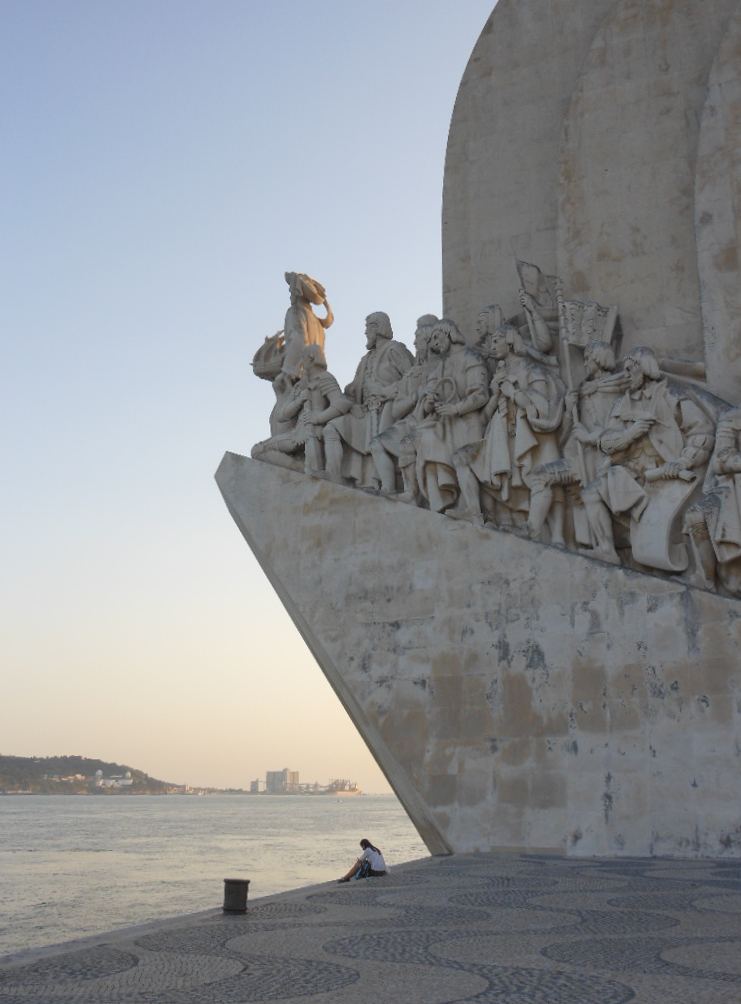
Prince Henry is the central figure on the Monument to the Discoveries in Lisbon.

In 1424 Cape Bojador was the most southerly point known to Europeans on the west coast of Africa. For centuries, superstitious seafarers held that beyond the cape lay sea monsters and the edge of the world. However, Prince Henry was determined to know the truth. He was persistent and sent 15 expeditions over a ten-year period to pass the dreaded Cape. Each returned unsuccessful. The captains gave various excuses for having failed. Finally, in 1434 Gil Eanes, the commander of one of Henry's expeditions, became the first known European to pass Cape Bojador.

Using the new caravel, the expeditions then pushed onwards. Nuno Tristão and Antão Gonçalves reached Cape Blanco in 1441. About this year, Henry he informed the Pope of his endeavours and petitioned for a concession in perpetuity to Portugal of any lands that might be discovered beyond Bojador. News of discovery was considered so valuable that a Papal Bull was immediately issued and subsequently confirmed by Nicholas V and Sixtus IV. Duke Peter, then acting as regent, also granted Henry the royal fifth of the produce of the expeditions, and issued a mandate that none should go on these expeditions without Henry's authorization.

The Portuguese sighted the Bay of Arguin in 1443. This year, a company of merchants of Lagos obtained from Prince Henry a charter for the exclusive right to trade along the African coast for a limited time, and began sending ships the following year. Prince Henry would later build a small fort on Arguin for the accommodation of the merchants and they established a feitoria there, to where they sent ships annually to sell grain, woollen cloth, linen and silver in exchange for gold dust and slaves.

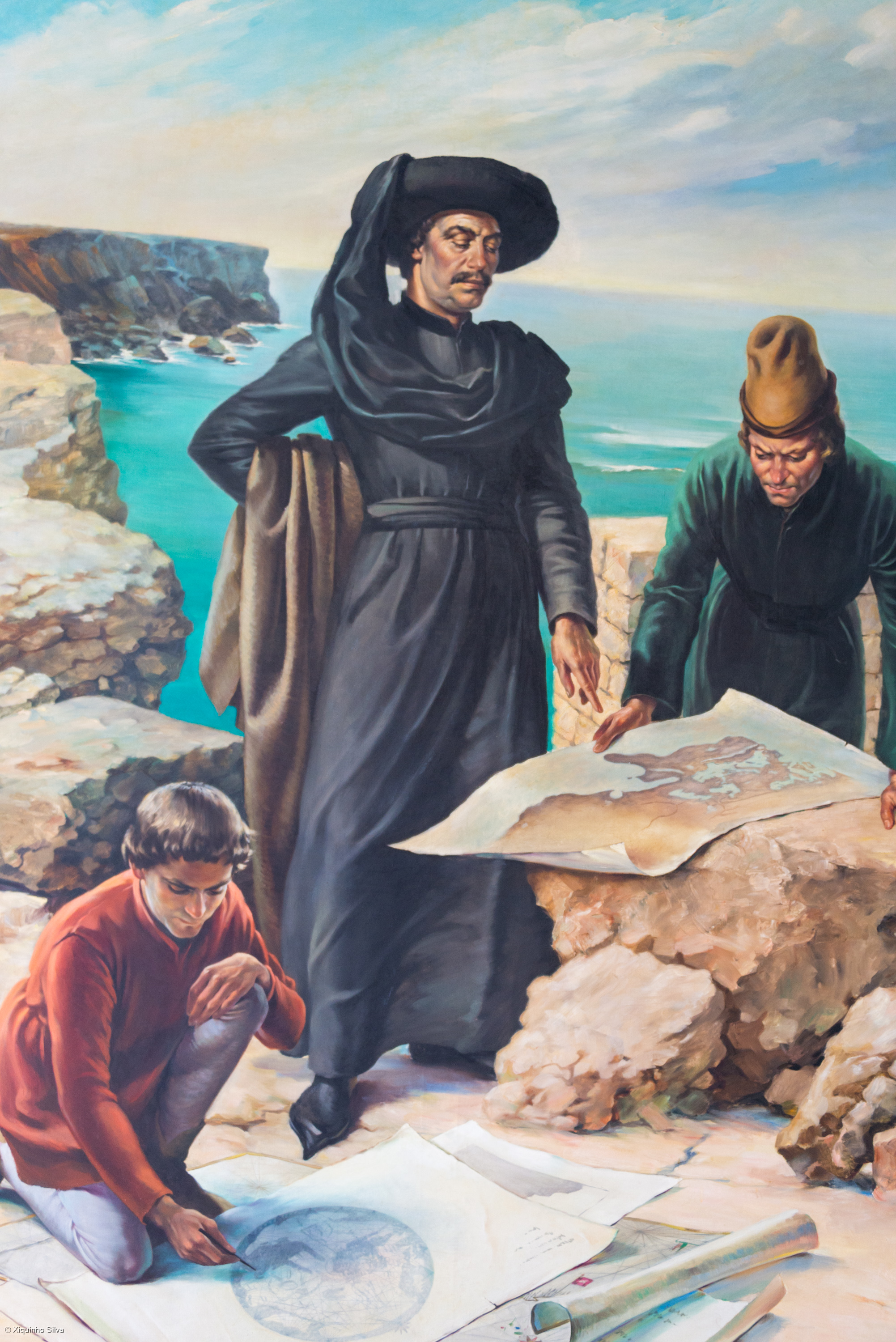
Prince Henry depicted in a contemporary painting.

Dinis Dias soon came across the Senegal River and rounded the peninsula of Cap-Vert in 1444. By this stage the explorers had passed the southern boundary of the desert, and from then on Henry had one of his wishes fulfilled: the Portuguese had circumvented the Muslim land-based trade routes across the western Sahara Desert, and slaves and gold began arriving in Portugal. This rerouting of trade devastated Algiers and Tunis, but made Portugal rich. By 1452, the influx of gold permitted the minting of Portugal's first gold cruzado coins. A cruzado was equal to 400 reis at the time. From 1444 to 1446, as many as forty vessels sailed from Lagos on Henry's behalf, and the first private mercantile expeditions began.

Alvise Cadamosto explored the Atlantic coast of Africa and discovered several islands of the Cape Verde archipelago between 1453 and 1456. In his first voyage, which started on 22 March 1455, he visited the Madeira Islands and the Canary Islands. On the second voyage, in 1456, Cadamosto became the first European to reach the Cape Verde Islands. António Noli later claimed the credit. By 1462, the Portuguese had explored the coast of Africa as far as present-day Sierra Leone. Twenty-eight years later, Bartolomeu Dias proved that Africa could be circumnavigated when he reached the southern tip of the continent, now known as the Cape of Good Hope. In 1498, Vasco da Gama became the first European sailor to reach India by sea.

== Expedition to Alcácer-Ceguer ==
Late in his life, Prince Henry participated in an expedition against the north-African town of Ksar es-Seghir, led by king Afonso V. Ksar es-Seguir at the time served as a pirate haven for the Marinid sultan, with whom Portugal was at war.

When the Ottomans captured Constantinople in 1453, Pope Calixtus III called for a Crusade, and the Portuguese king pledged an army. He later found to have been the only monarch to have heeded the call. Calixtus died in 6 August 1458 and Afonso decided to attack Tangier in Morocco instead, but was persuaded by the governor of Ceuta Sancho de Noronha to seize Ksar es-Seghir instead.

The final gathering of men and ships took place in Lagos, and the Portuguese fleet numbered 200 or 220 ships and 25,000 or 26,000 warriors, not counting sailors and supporting personnel. Henry commanded the Algarve detachment. They set sail to Alcácer-Ceguer in 12 October 1458.

== Origin of the "Navigator" nickname ==
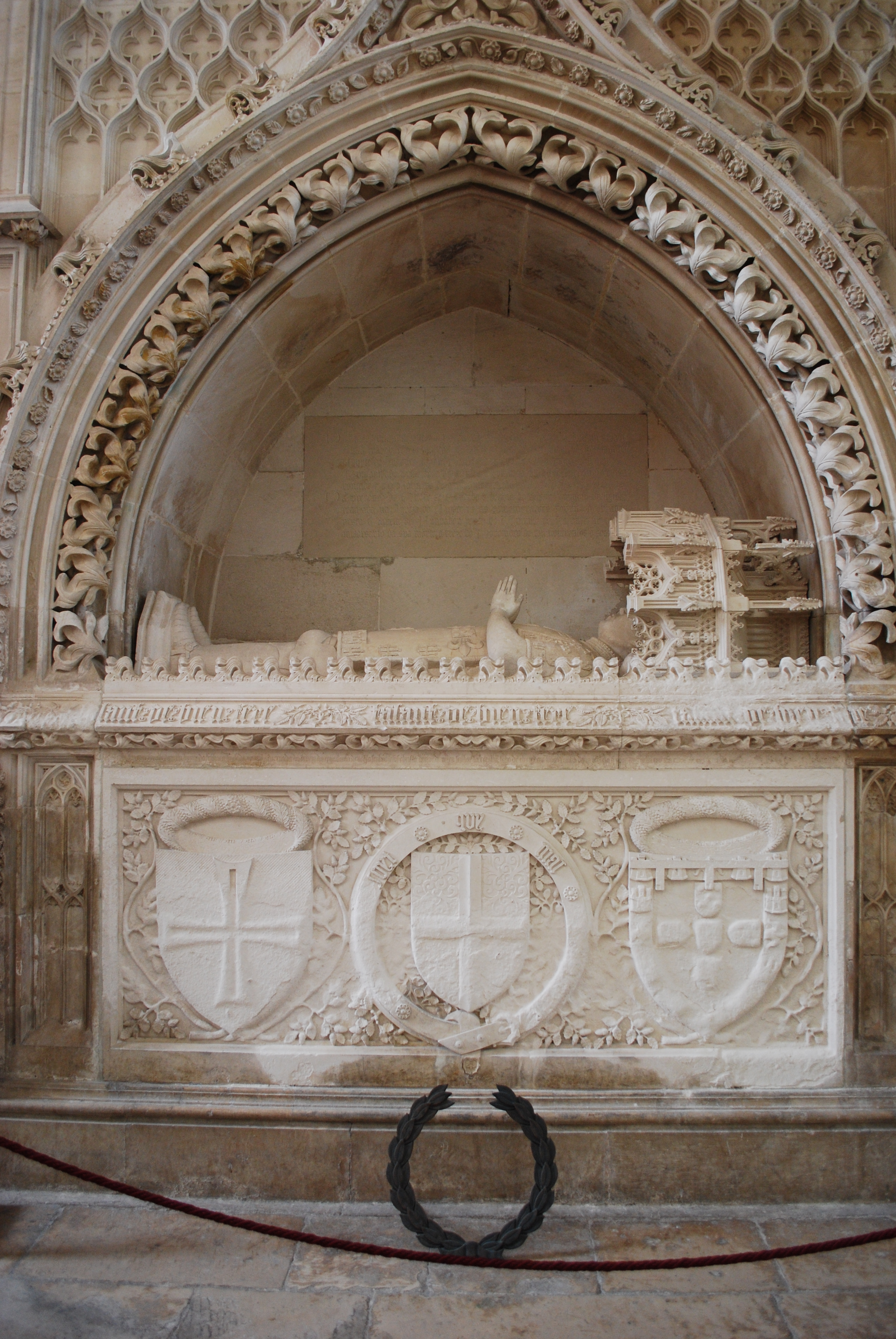
Henry's tomb in the Monastery of Batalha.

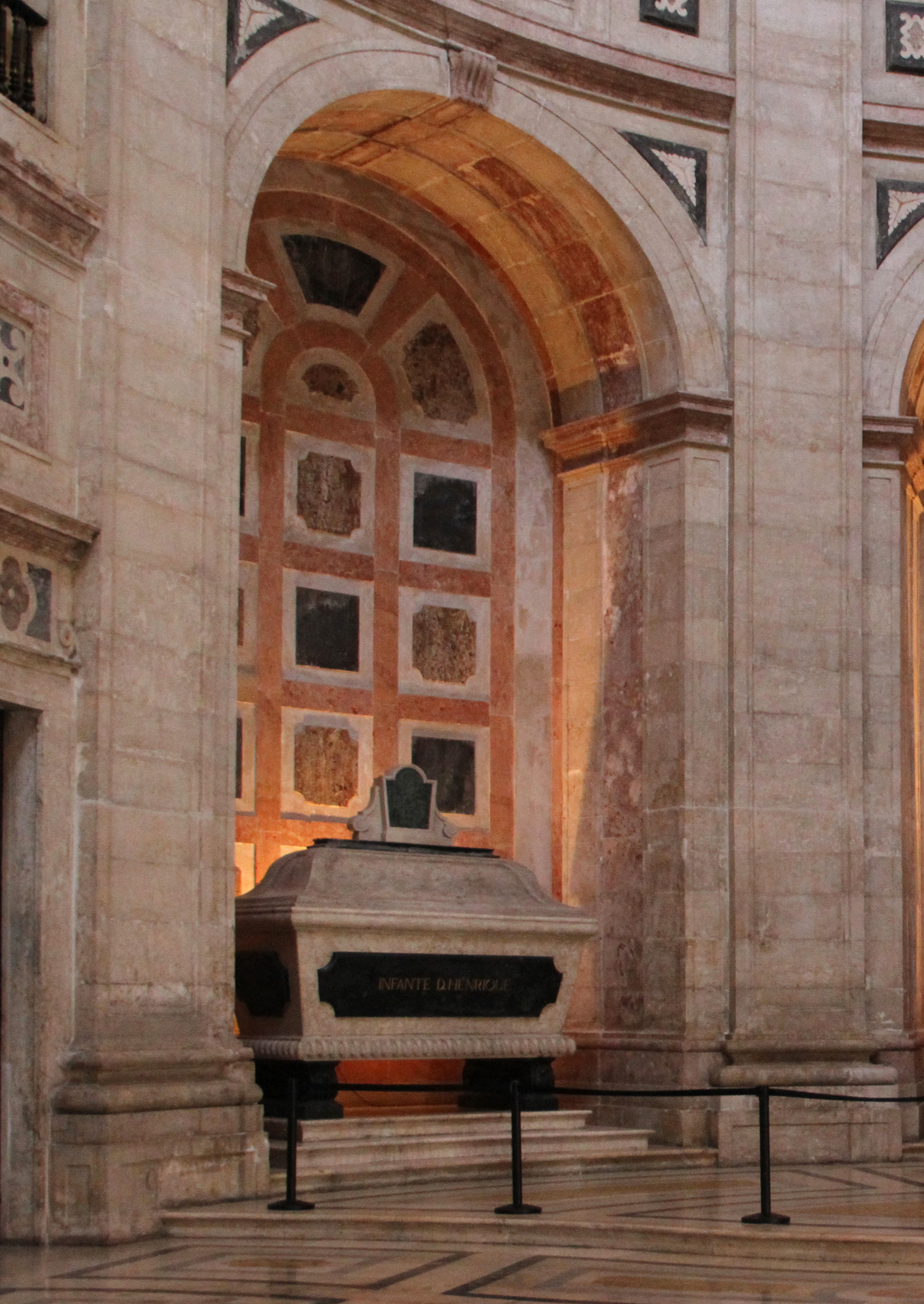
Cenotaph at the National Pantheon in Lisbon.

No one used the nickname "Henry the Navigator" to refer to Prince Henry during his lifetime or in the following three centuries. The term was coined by two nineteenth-century German historians, Heinrich Schaefer and Gustave de Veer. It was later popularized by two British authors who included it in the titles of their biographies of the prince: Henry Major in 1868 and Raymond Beazley in 1895.

Unlike his brothers, Prince Henry was not praised for his intellectual gifts by his contemporaries. It was only later chroniclers such as João de Barros and Damião de Góis who attributed him a scholarly character and an interest for cosmography. The myth of the "Sagres school" allegedly founded by Prince Henry was created in the 18th century, mainly by Samuel Purchas and Abbé Prévost. In nineteenth-century Portugal, the idealized vision of Prince Henry as a putative pioneer of exploration and science reached its apogee.

== Death and legacy ==
Henry died on the 13th of November 1460, being initially buried in the Church of Saint Mary of Lagos before being subsequently moved to the Monastery of Batalha, where his tomb remains, inscribed by his motto "Talant de bien faire".

Henry is depicted in the Monument of the Discoveries located in Lisbon, featured in the front of the monument.

In 1994, the Prince Henry Society in conjunction with the Portuguese government gifted Prince Henry the Navigator Park in New Bedford, Massachusetts.

From 1996 until Portugal's adoption of euro in 2002, he was depicted on the obverse of the largest denomination (10,000) note of the Portuguese escudo.

Monuments to Prince Henry around the world

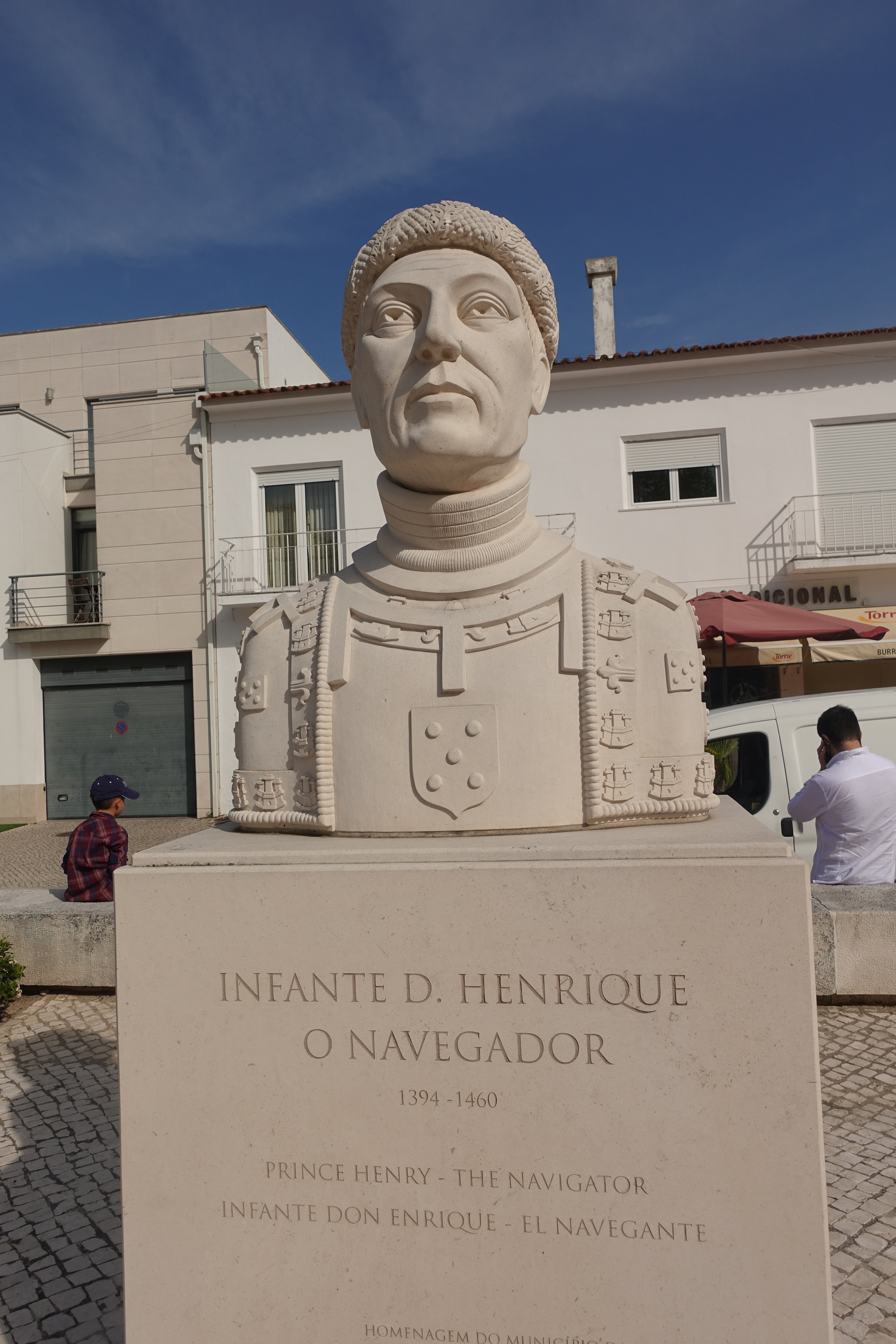
Batalha, Portugal

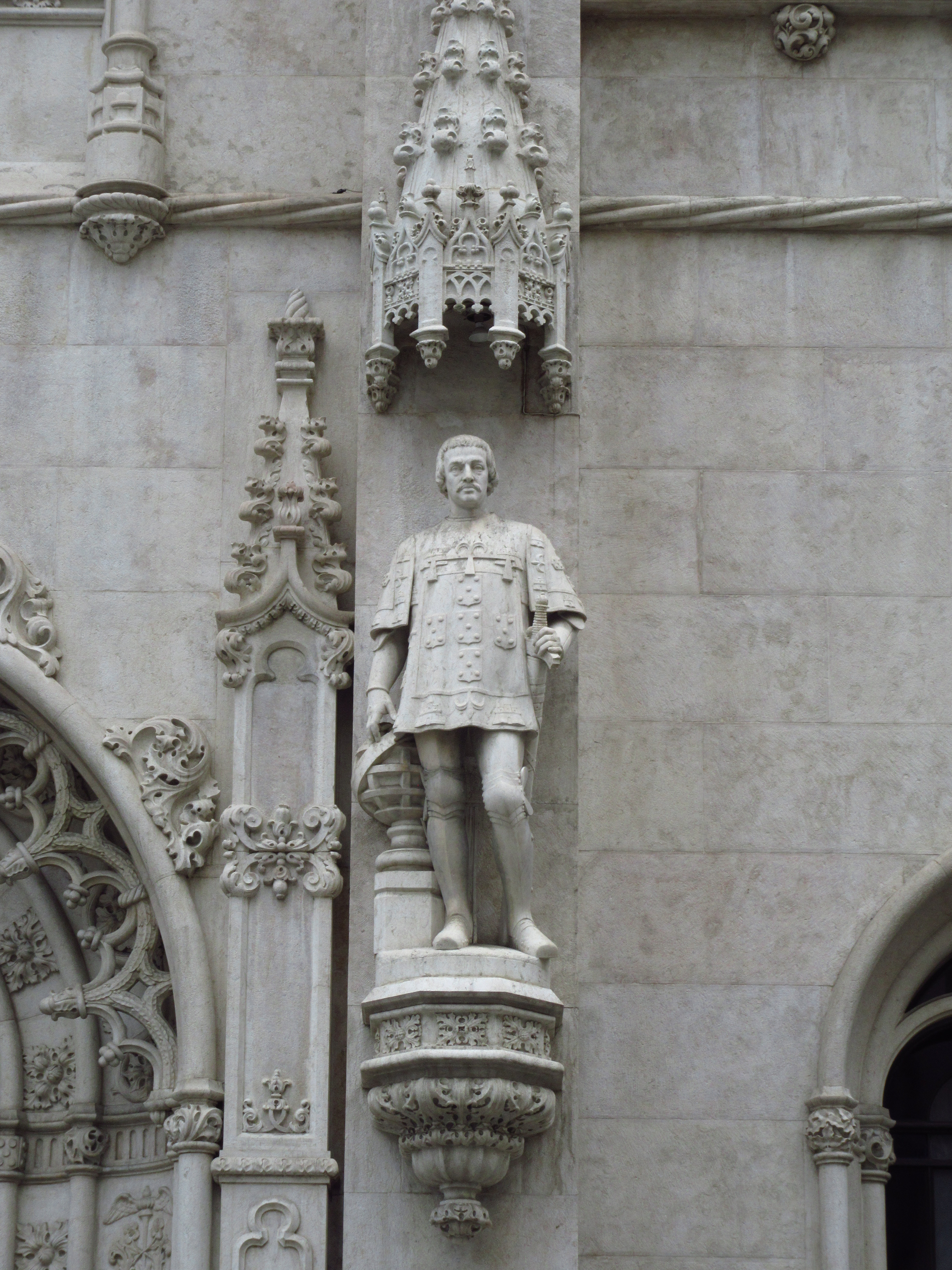
Rio de Janeiro, Brazil

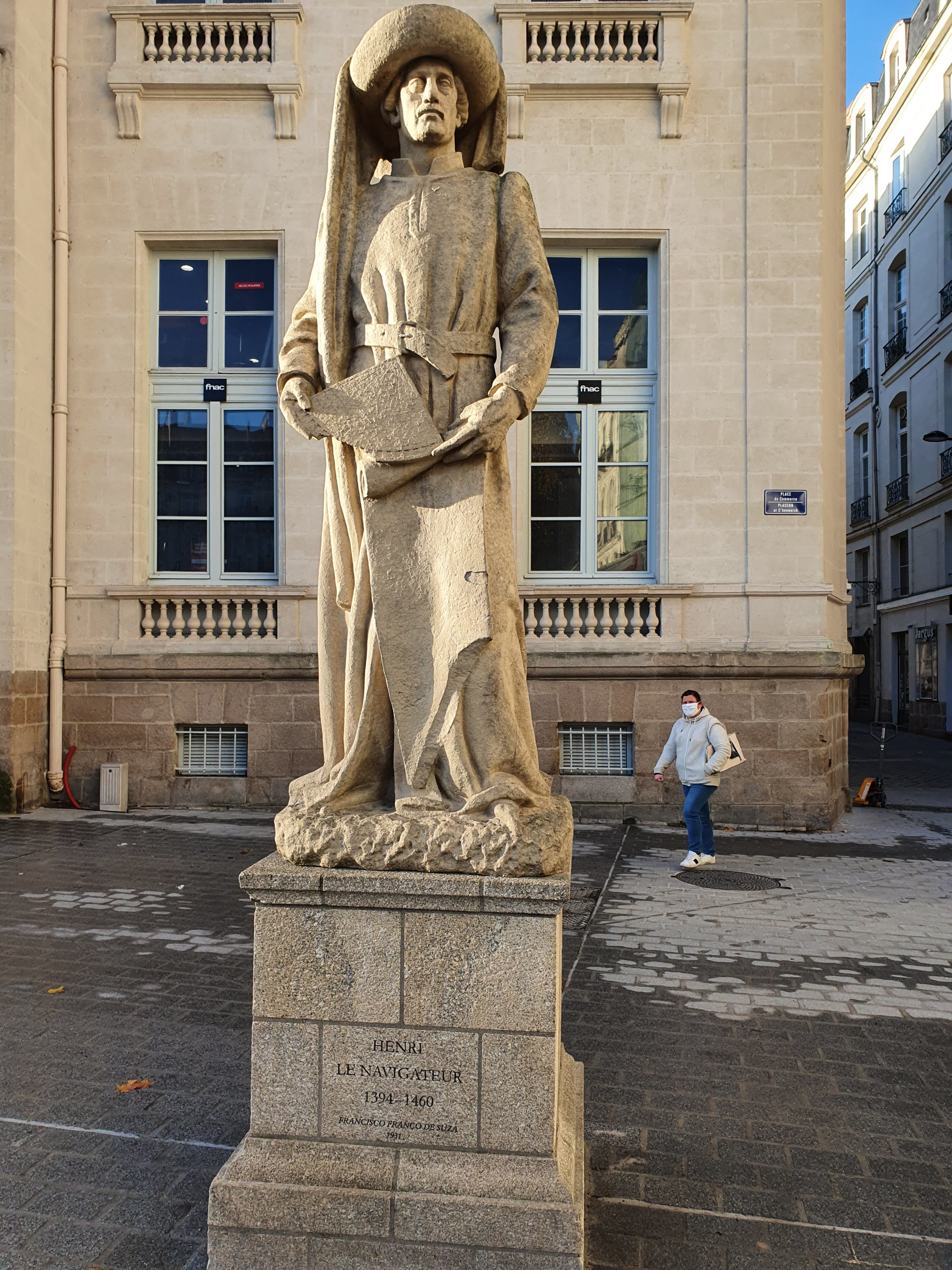
Nantes, France

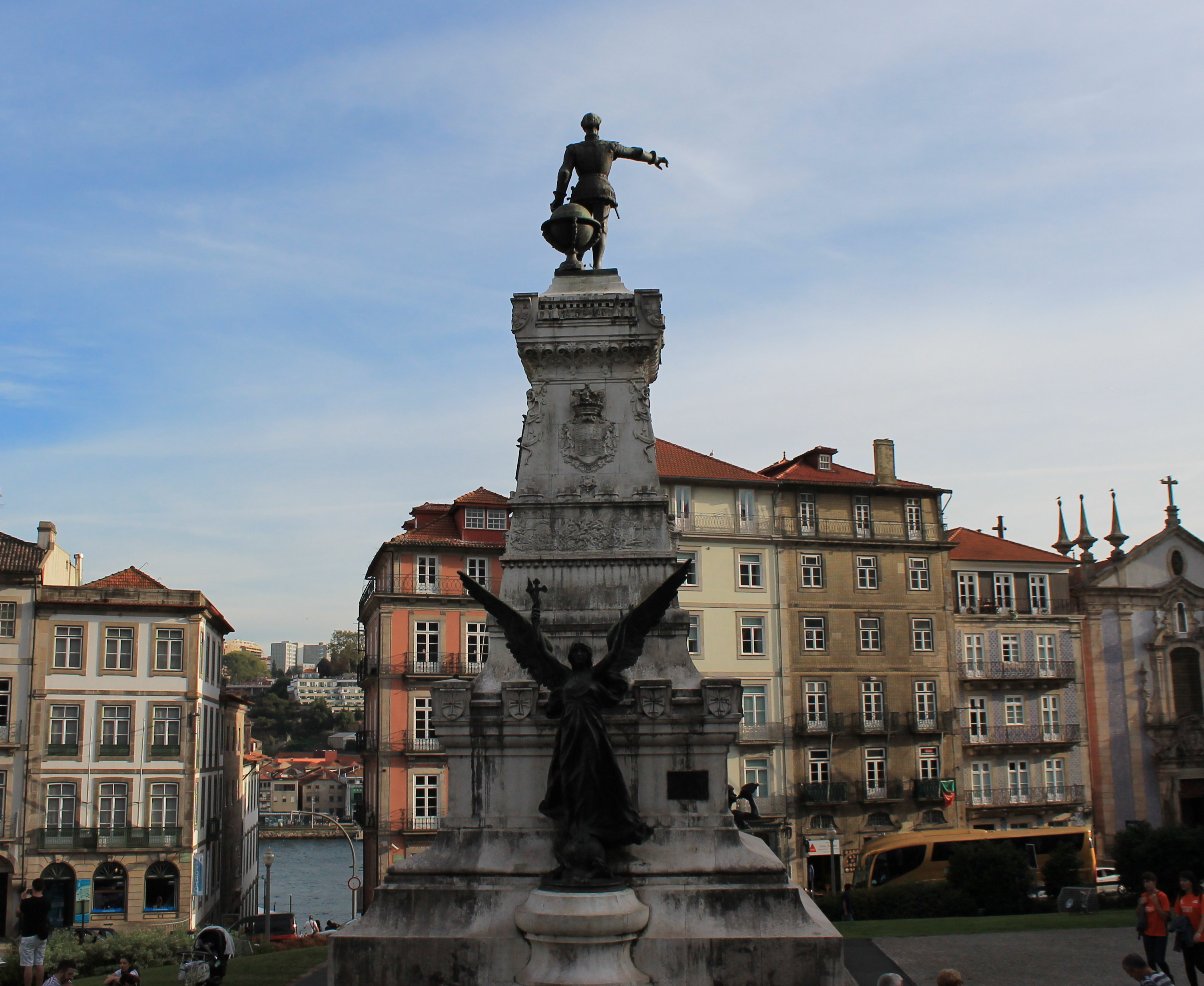
Porto, Portugal

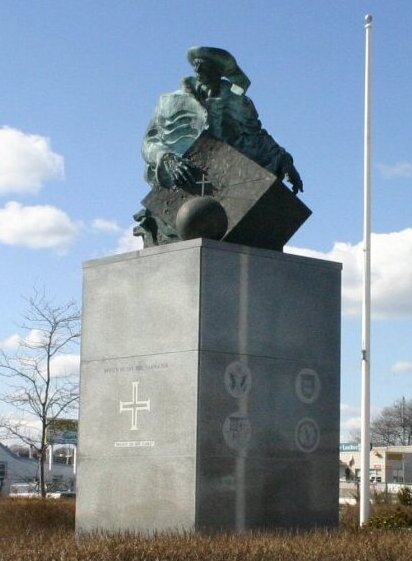
New Bedford, United States

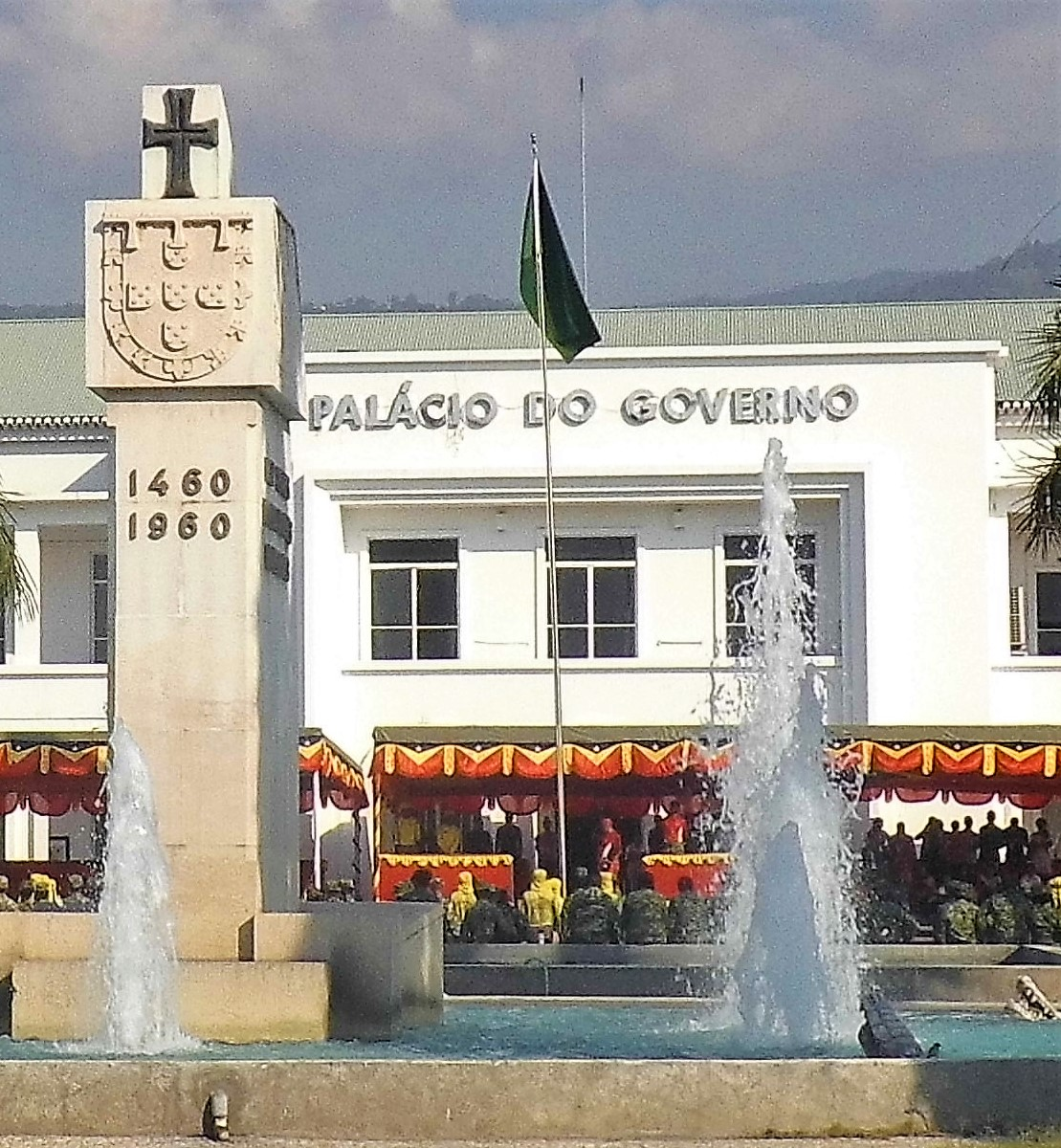
Dili, Timor-Leste

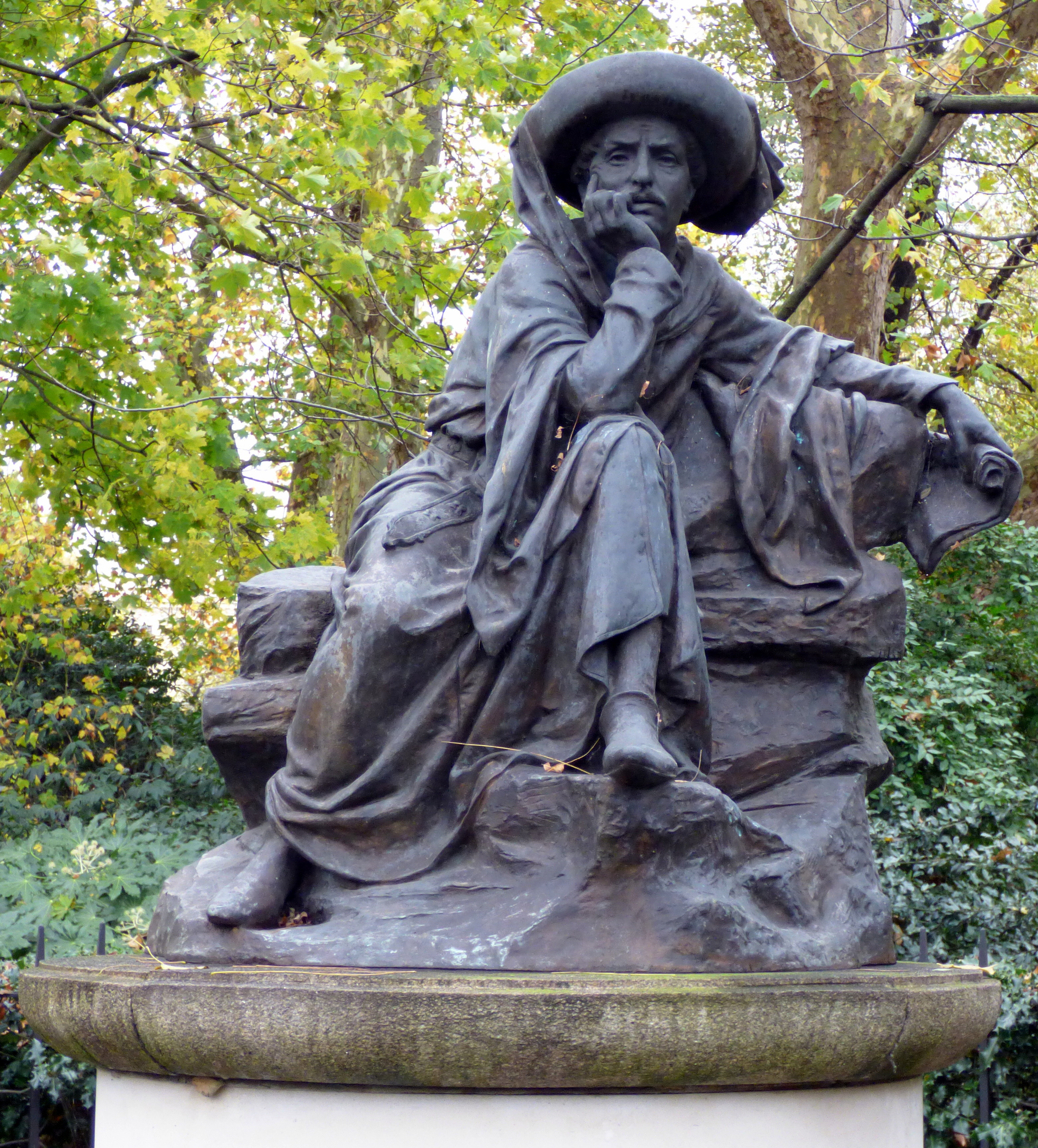
London, United Kingdom

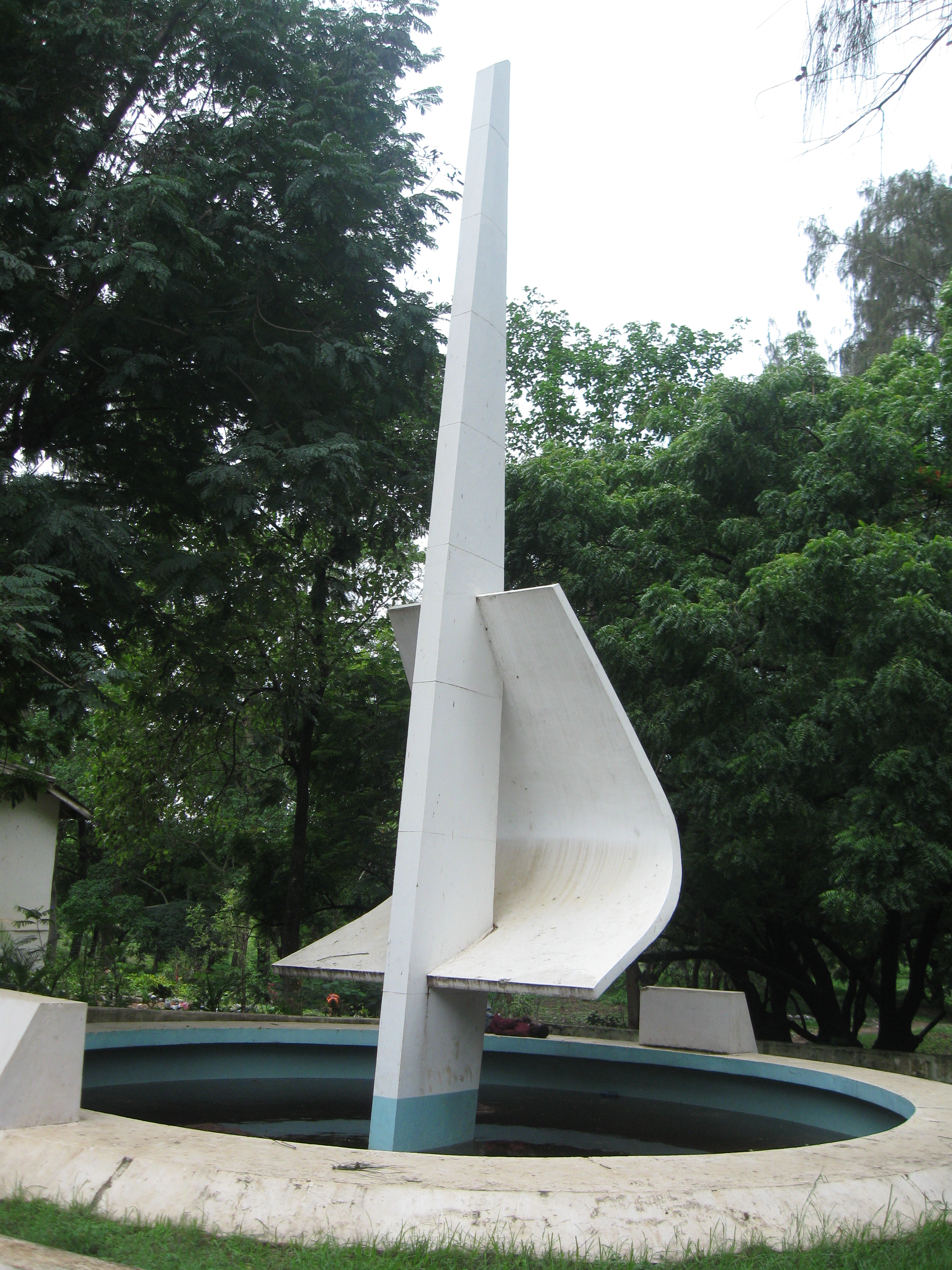
Malindi, Kenya

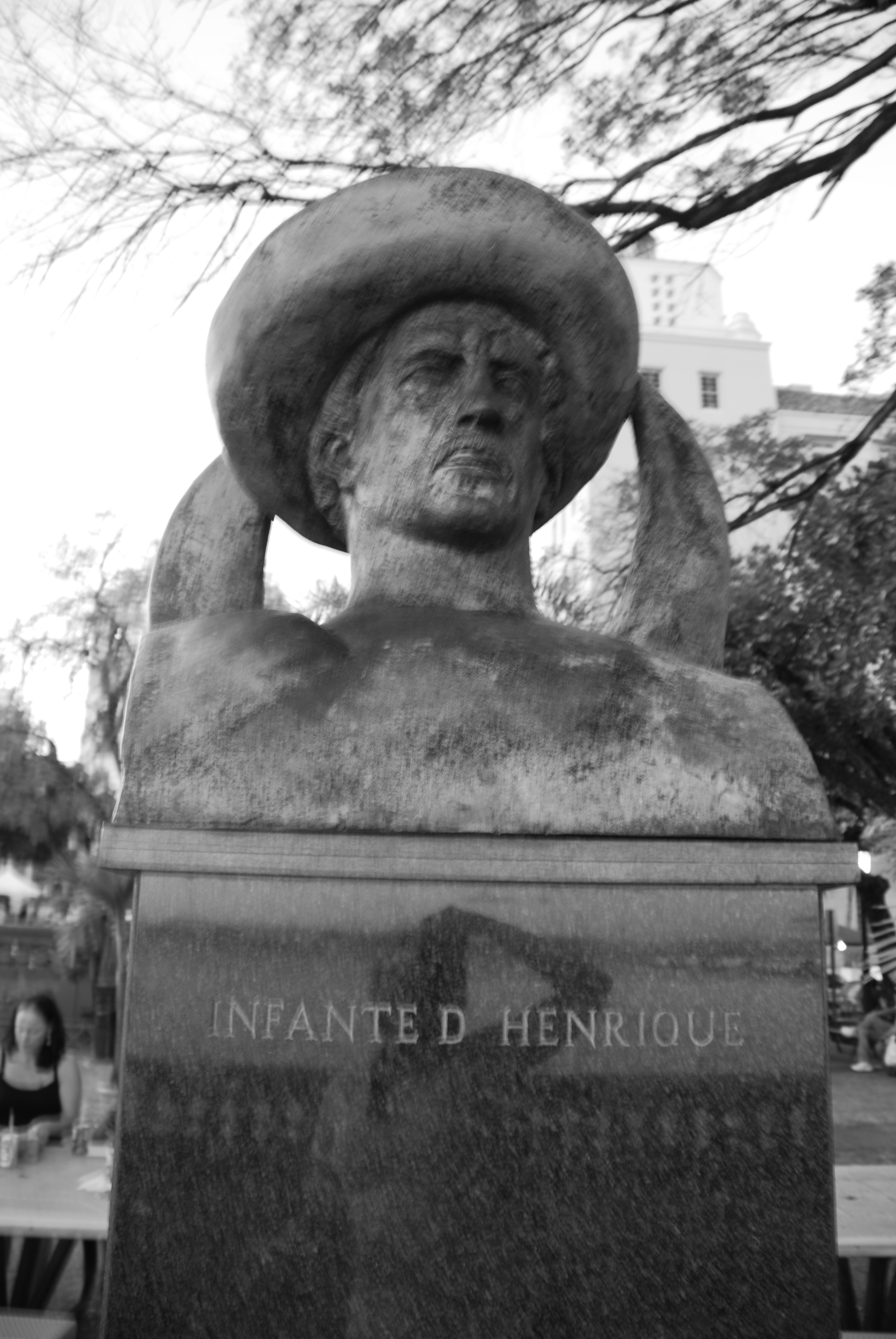
San Juan, Puerto Rico.

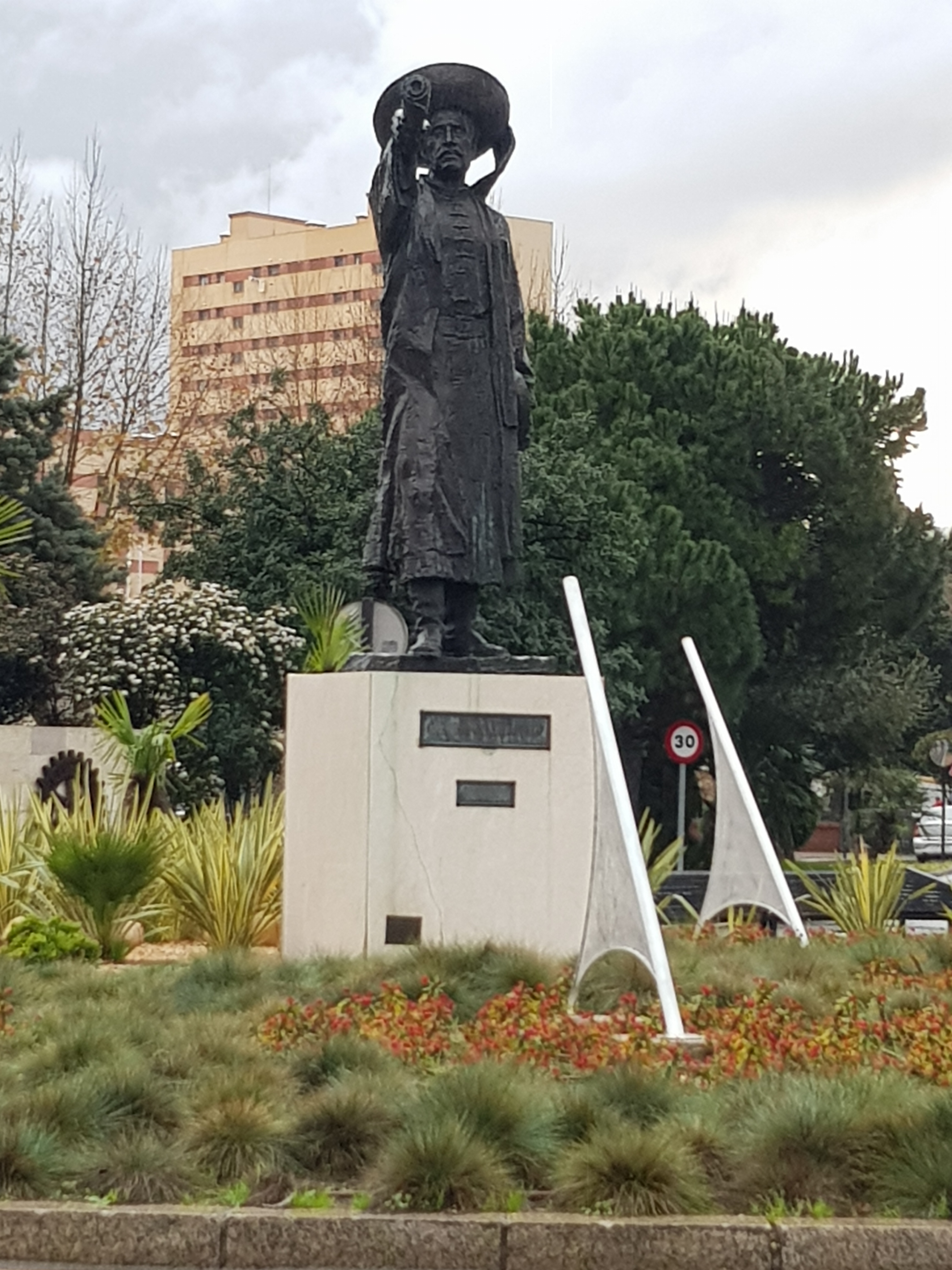
Ceuta, Spain.

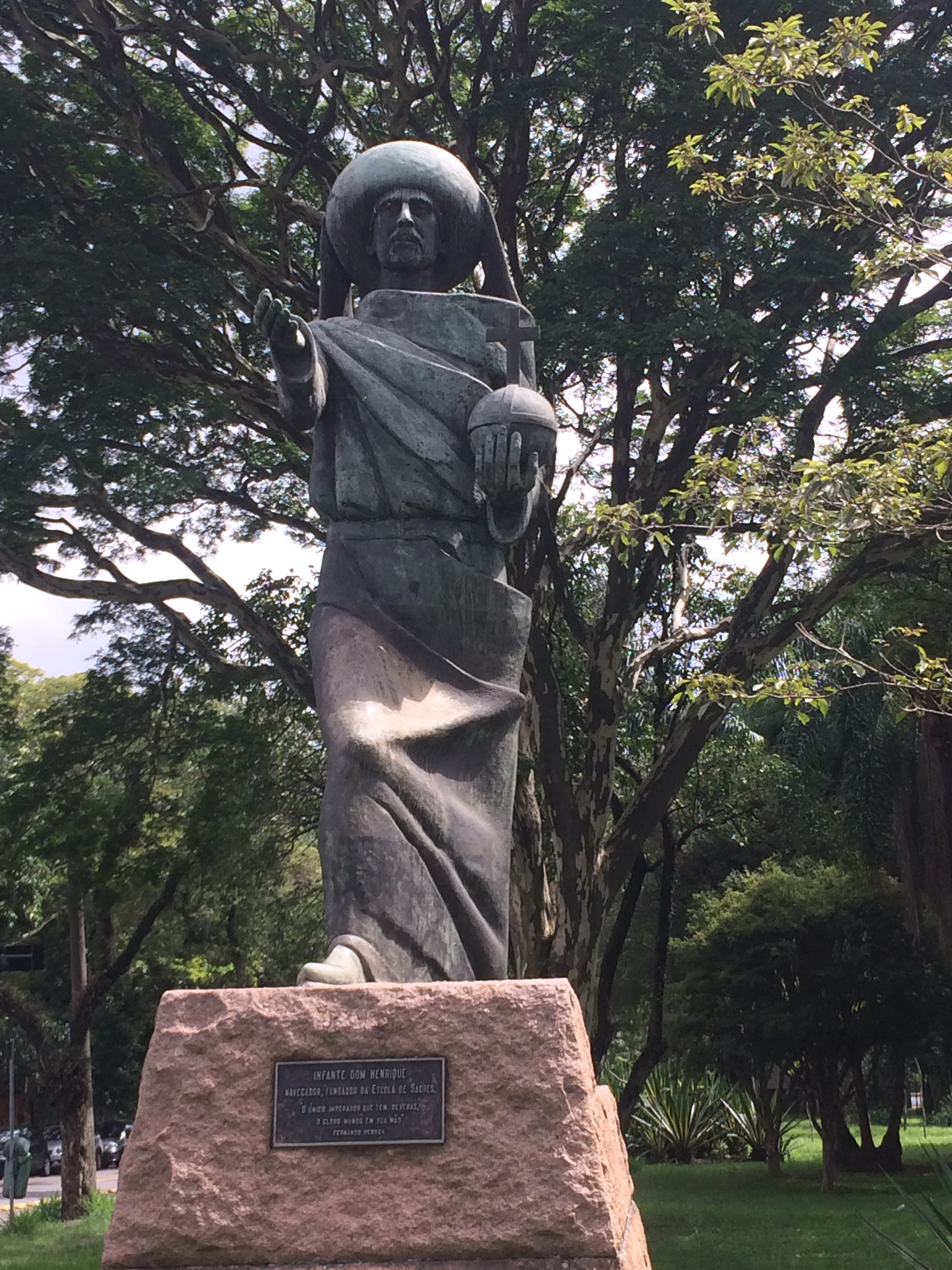
São Paulo, Brazil.

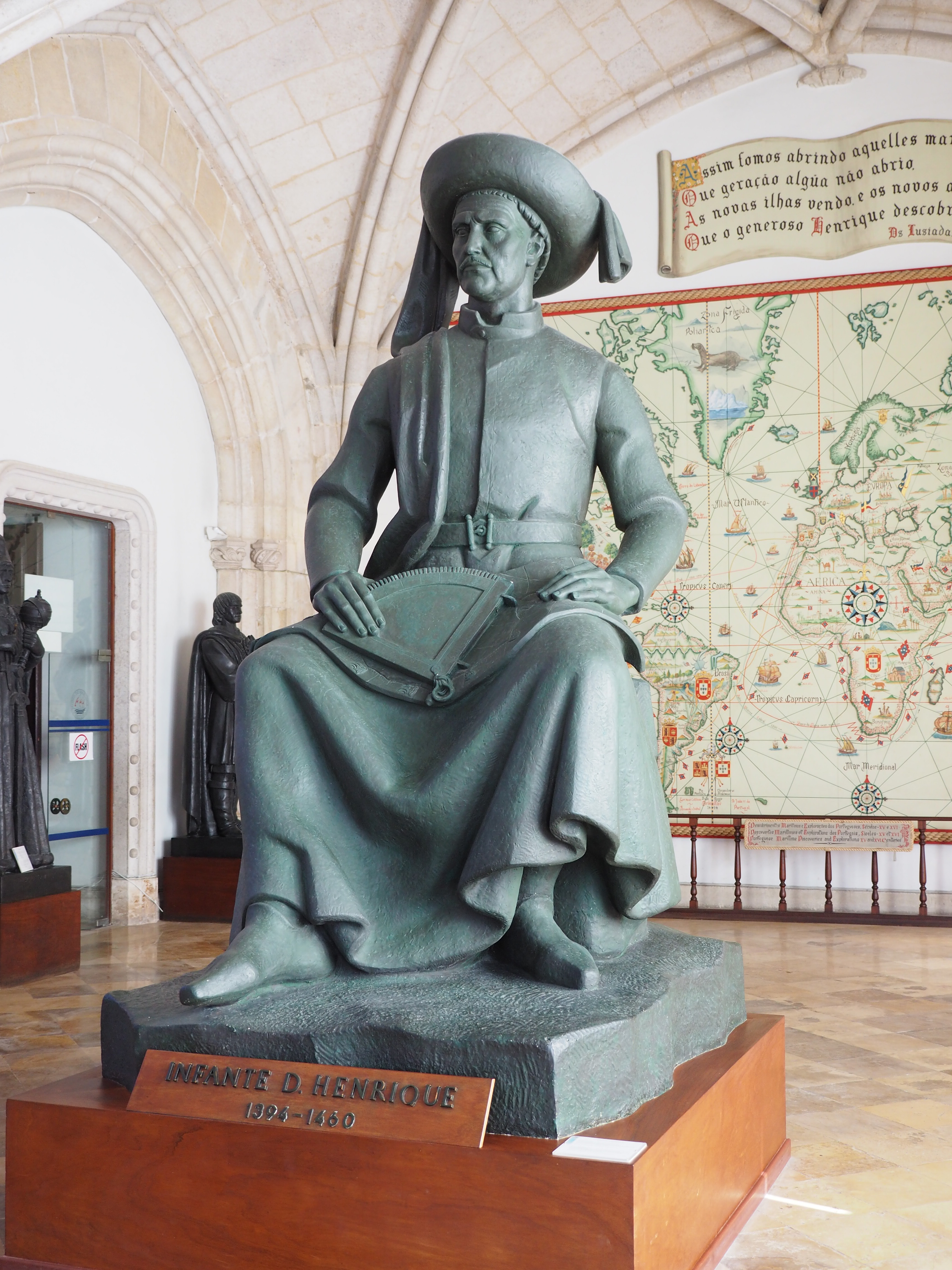
Maritime Museum at Lisbon.

== See also ==
- Order of Prince Henry
- Iberian nautical sciences, 1400–1600
- Prince Henry the Navigator (statue)

== Sourcesd ==
- Ariganello, Lisa. Henry the Navigator : prince of Portuguese exploration (2007); for elementary schools. online
- Beazley, C. Raymond (1894). Prince Henry the Navigator, the Hero of Portugal and of Modern Discovery, 1394–1460 A.D.: With an Account of Geographical Progress Throughout the Middle Ages As the Preparation for His Work. London: G.P. Putnam's Sons.
- Beazley, Charles Raymond (1911). "Henry of Portugal" . In Chisholm, Hugh (ed.). Encyclopædia Britannica. Vol. 13 (11th ed.). Cambridge University Press. pp. 296–297.
- Boxer, Charles (1991). The Portuguese Seaborne Empire, 1415–1825 (2nd rev. ed.). Carcanet Press. ISBN 978-0-85635-962-0.
- Bradford, Ernle. A Wind from the North: The Life of Henry the Navigator (1960) online or Southward the Caravels: The Story of Henry the Navigator (UK edition, 1961)
- Castro, F.; Fonseca, N.; Vacas, T.; Ciciliot, F. (2008), "A Quantitative Look at Mediterranean Lateen- and Square-Rigged Ships (Part 1)", The International Journal of Nautical Archaeology, vol. 37, no. 2, pp. 347–359, Bibcode:2008IJNAr..37..347C, doi:10.1111/j.1095-9270.2008.00183.x, S2CID 45072686
- Cerqueiro, Daniel (1999). El Navegante y la Fuerza de las Ideas. Ed. Pequeña Venecia. ISNN Nº 987-9239-09-1
- Diffie, Bailey; George D. Winius (1977). Foundations of the Portuguese empire, 1415–1580. University of Minnesota Press. ISBN 978-0-8166-0782-2.
- Elbl, Ivana. "Man of His Time (and Peers): A New Look at Henry the Navigator." Luso-Brazilian Review 28.2 (1991): 73–89. online
- Fernández-Armesto, Felipe (1987). Before Columbus: Exploration and Colonisation from the Mediterranean to the Atlantic, 1229–1492. London: MacMillan Education. ISBN 978-0-333-40383-9.
- Major, Richard Henry (1877). The discoveries of Prince Henry, the Navigator, and their results. London: Sampson, Low, Marston, Searle and Rivington. OCLC 84044057.
- Martins, J.P. Oliveira (1914). The golden age of Prince Henry the Navigator. London: Chapman and Hall.
- Russell, Peter E. (2000). Prince Henry "the Navigator": a life. New Haven: Yale University Press. ISBN 978-0-300-08233-3. OCLC 42708239.
- Gomes Eanes de Zurara (1896). Chronica do Descobrimento e Conquista da Guiné, vol. 1 (The chronicle of discovery and conquest of Guinea). Translated by Charles Raymond Beazley; Edgar Prestage. Hakluyt Society.
- Gomes Eanes de Zurara (1896). Chronica do Descobrimento e Conquista da Guiné, vol. 2. Translated by Charles Raymond Beazley; Edgar Prestage. Printed for the Hakluyt Society.

Henry the Navigator House of Aviz Cadet branch of the House of Burgundy Born: 4 March 1394 Died: 13 November 1460
Portuguese royalty
New title	Duke of Viseu; 1415–1460	Succeeded by Ferdinand
Military offices
Preceded by Nuno Rodrigues	Grand Master of the Order of Christ; 1420–1460	Vacant Title next held by Ferdinand
