= Globus Jagellonicus =

French globe

Jagiellonian globe

The Jagiellonian globe, also known as the Globus Jagellonicus, is a mechanical armillary sphere made in France before 1510. It is an astronomical instrument and a universal clock tracking both local solar time and sidereal time. The central brass sphere is engraved with a map of Earth and contains the clock mechanism. It is the oldest extant globe to use the name America.

The globe belonged to the medieval Cracow Academy (now called the Jagiellonian University); it is on display at the Collegium Maius Museum. It was rediscovered in the early 1870s and described as Globus Jagellonicus in 1900 by Prof. Tadeusz Estreicher in the Transactions of the Cracow Academy of Sciences for that year. At the time, when no Polish state existed for about a century, Prof. Estreicher points out that this globe indicating recent geographical discoveries, throws special light on the interest taken by Polish scholars of that time and in particular Jan Brożek (1585-1652), who listed this globe among his belongings in the inventory of his goods.

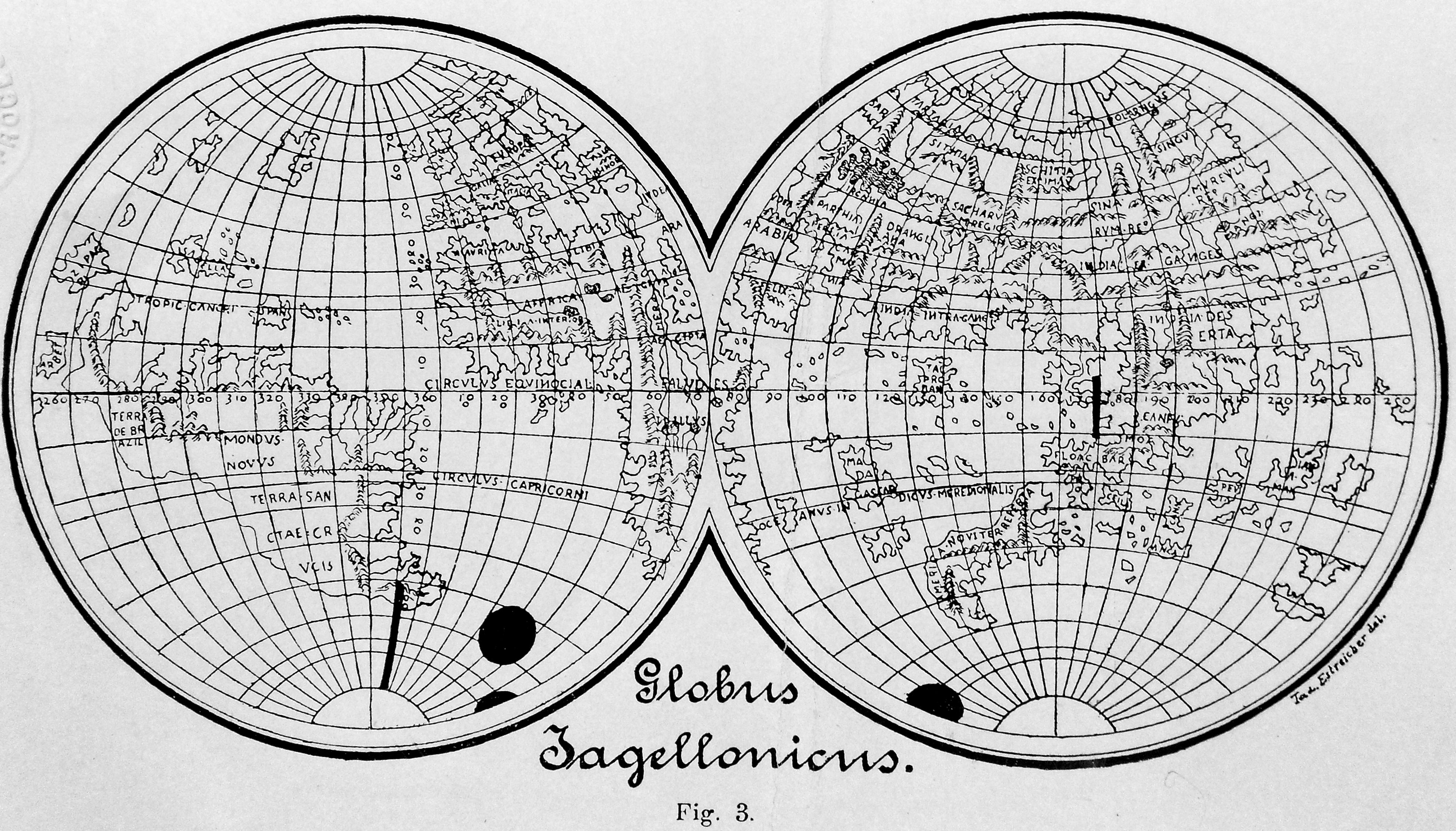
Map on Jagiellonian globe

The gilded copper globe is considered the earliest existing globe to indicate any part of the New World and the first to delineate the South American continent. It is also believed to be the oldest globe on which the continent of America is shown to be distinct from that of Asia. It uses the name "America" as part of a Latin phrase AMERICA NOVITER REPERTA. It uses the name "America", which had been introduced in 1507 by Martin Waldseemüller in his Universalis Cosmographia, though for a continent located to the south of India. A replica of the globe is on display in the Polish Nationality Room at the University of Pittsburgh

Robert J. King has pointed out that America was shown on the Jagiellonian Globe in two locations: in the Atlantic Ocean under the names MUNDUS NOVUS, TERRA SANCTAE CRUCIS and TERRA DE BRAZIL; and in the Indian Ocean under the name AMERICA NOVITER REPERTA (America newly discovered). The phrase, America Noviter Reperta was used for the first time on a copper engraved map dating from c. 1507 and attributed to D.N. Germanus. It was subsequently printed in the woodcut booklet, Globus Mundi: Declaratio sive descriptio mundi et totius orbis terrarum, published in Strasbourg by J. Grüninger in 1509.

Drawing on the work of George E. Nunn, Robert J. King presented the hypothesis that the bilocation of America in the eastern and western hemispheres resulted from the two different scales of longitude employed. The oldest one used by Claudius Ptolemy who allowed 180 degrees between the westernmost point of Europe, Cape St. Vincent in Portugal and Cattigara on the easternmost point of Asia. The younger one applied by Christopher Columbus, who allowed 225 degrees for the same distance. According to the Columban calculation, therefore, the New World/America was closer to Europe, its most western part no more than 135 degrees west of Portugal, while according to the Ptolemaic calculation, it was further west, to the South of India, as seen on the Jagiellonian Globe.

Robert J. King described this explanation as a solution to the problem of representing the known world so that both the Ptolemaic and the Columbian ideas could be represented similar to that devised by Martin Waldseemüller for his world map of 1507, as described by Nunn. Acceptance of the Columbus claims to have reached the Indies (Eastern Asia) involved a rejection of Ptolemy's degree value and longitudes. As a result, there was a conflict between the Columbian and the Ptolemaic schools of geography. It was impossible satisfactorily to indicate that Columbus had reached eastern Asia if the cartographer retained the Ptolemy longitudes and attempted to represent the entire 360 degrees of the Earth's circumference. Waldseemüller's map was a reconciliation of the Columbian longitudes with the Ptolemy longitudes as shown on the Erdapfel of Martin Behaim, made in Nuremberg in 1492. On the right-hand side of his world map Waldseemüller indicated the Ptolemy/Behaim conception included within 270 degrees of longitude from the meridian of the Canary Islands to the east, including the island of Zipango. The Waldseemüller map thus represents on its right hand side the Behaim conception of the Earth as far as longitude 270ºE and terminates in the east with an open sea. The ocean East of Asia is named the Occeanus Orientalis Indicus.

According to Robert J. King the above bilocation is applied likewise, on the Jagiellonian Globe as the different scales of longitude running eastward and westward result in a bilocation of America in the eastern and western hemispheres.

It is not uncommon in case of new discoveries that there exited a certain uncertainty, even confusion. Therefore, it seems likely that the French horologist seems to have been confused about the precise location in the antipodal region of the newly discovered world. As a result, he engraved AMERICA NOVITER REPERTA in the wrong place, namely on a large, unnamed cartographic island in the Indian Ocean which was nameless on the Lenox Globe. This island has a mountain range which is aligned for much of its length along a meridian. Several rivers flow to the East from this mountain range into the unnamed Indian Ocean. It cannot be excluded that the horologist Jean Coudray may have had access to the Cosmographiae Introductio of Martin Waldseemüller. But there is no evidence for such a substantiation be it cartographic, bibliographical, orthographic or toponymic.

Since the name "America" is missing from the Lenox Globe, although there are already three toponyms on the Latin American Landmass of the Lenox, the French clockmaker may have chosen a left-over empty space that is even more western for him.

Due to the lack of space on the small globe this large unknown, anonymous and "empty" island seems to have come in handy for him during the continuous mental production work he updated and added the phrase in Latin "recently discovered America". Jean Coudray was aware of the naming of America but not about its precise cartographic location, which was not available in the contemporary source, the printed woodcut of the "Globus Mundi": Declaratio sive descriptio mundi et totius orbis" by Johannes Adelphus dating from 1509.

On a Ptolemaic land bridge between Africa and Asia, printed on a world map of Gregor Reisch in the Woodcut publication dating from 1503 in Basel with the title Margaretha Filosophica it states in Latin translated here into English: "Here is not land but sea, in which there are islands of remarkable size unknown to Ptolemy." The specific location of this phrase and its content "islands of remarkable size" are in the South Indian Ocean, where the horologist put AMERICA NOVITER REPERTA.

== See also ==
- Collegium Novum
- Erdapfel of Martin Behaim, made in Nuremberg in 1492
- Ostrich Egg Globe
