= Glockendon =

Glockendon is a German surname. In particular, the Glockendons were a family of 15th-16th-century German artists from Nuremberg.

- Albrecht Glockendon the Elder (also called "Albrecht I"; c.1432 — 1474)
  - Georg Glockendon the Elder (died 1514); son of Albrecht
    - Albrecht Glockendon II (also called "the Elder" or "the Younger"; died 1545); son of Georg
      - Albrecht Glockendon III
      - Jörg Glockendon (also called "Georg G."; died before 1548)
    - Nikolaus Glockendon (d. 1534); son of Georg
      - Georg Glockendon II ("the Younger"; 1492–1553); son of Nikolaus
      - Gabriel Glockendon (active c. 1570–1595); son of Nikolaus
      - Nikolaus Glockendon the Younger (died before 1547), diamond and gem cutter, probably also sculptor
      - Sebastian Glockendon the Elder (born c. 1525, floruit 1555), miniature painter
        - Sebastian Glockendon the Younger (active c. 1575)
      - Wolf Glockendon (buried 19 September 1561), goldsmith, engaged with Elisabeth Zarteissen
- Georg Glockendon the Younger (III) (1492–1553), painter
  - Conrad Glockendon (buried 1594), hourglass maker
- Hans Glockendon (mentioned 1541)
