= Here There Be Monsters =

Here There Be Monsters may refer to:

- "Here There Be Monsters", an episode of The Dead Zone
- Here There Be Monsters, a Doctor Who audio play

== See also ==
- Here be dragons
