= Georg Glockendon =

German painter

Georg Glockendon the Elder (fl. 1484 - died 1514) was a Nuremberg-based woodblock cutter, printer and painter. Famed during his lifetime for his illuminations, he was also an industrious printer and published a number of the works of Erhard Etzlaub. The Erdapfel of Martin Behaim is the best known of his painted works, the majority of which remain unidentified. As a member of the Glockendon family of artists, he was the father of miniaturist and woodcutter Albrecht Glockendon II, who took over the family workshop, and master illuminator Nikolaus Glockendon.
