= Nikolaus Glockendon =

German illustrator (fl. 1515–1534)

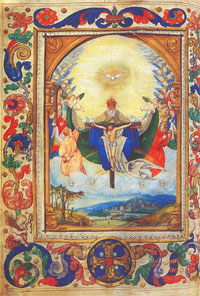
The Holy Trinity (German: Die Heilige Dreifaltigkeit), from the Missale festivum, c. 1525. Aschaffenburg, Church of St. Peter.

Nikolaus Glockendon the Elder (fl. 1511 - died 1534) was a German decorator of illuminated manuscripts (i.e. an illuminator) from Nuremberg, active in the early 16th century. The son of Georg Glockendon the Elder and brother of Albrecht Glockendon II, he came from the Glockendon family of illuminators and printers. His work is known from over thirty extant manuscripts, many of which he signed, usually with his initials "NG".

His manuscript illumination The Holy Trinity particularly demonstrates the influence of Albrecht Dürer's Adoration of the Trinity, also known as the Landauer Altarpiece, painted in 1511. Nikolaus Glockendon's career masterpiece is a ceremonial missal, now in the Hofbibliothek Aschaffenburg, known as the Missale Hallense. Dated 1524 and signed with the artist's full name, it was made for the Cardinal Albrecht of Brandenburg, Archbishop of Mainz and one of the major patrons of art in Germany during this period. See Albert of Mainz. The scholar Ulrich Merkl has documented the most comprehensive catalog of works by Glockendon and his workshop. Merkl also provides a family tree of the Glockendons (pp. 72–73), who produced several generations of artists in Nuremberg.
