= Albrecht Glockendon the Elder =

German artist (died 1474)

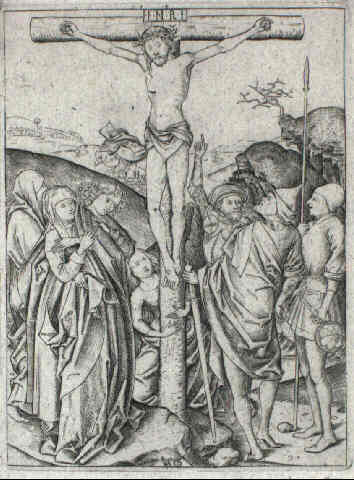
The Crucifixion (DE: Christus am Kreuz), engraving, 5.8 x 4.4 in.; 14.8 x 11.1 cm.

Albrecht Glockendon the Elder (c. 1432, Nuremberg – 1474), also spelled Albert Glockenton, was a German engraver and manuscript illuminator. He studied under Rogier van der Weyden, and was also influenced by Martin Schongauer. His descendants made up the large and active Glockendon family of artists.
