= Terra incognita =

"Unknown land", area not mapped by cartographers

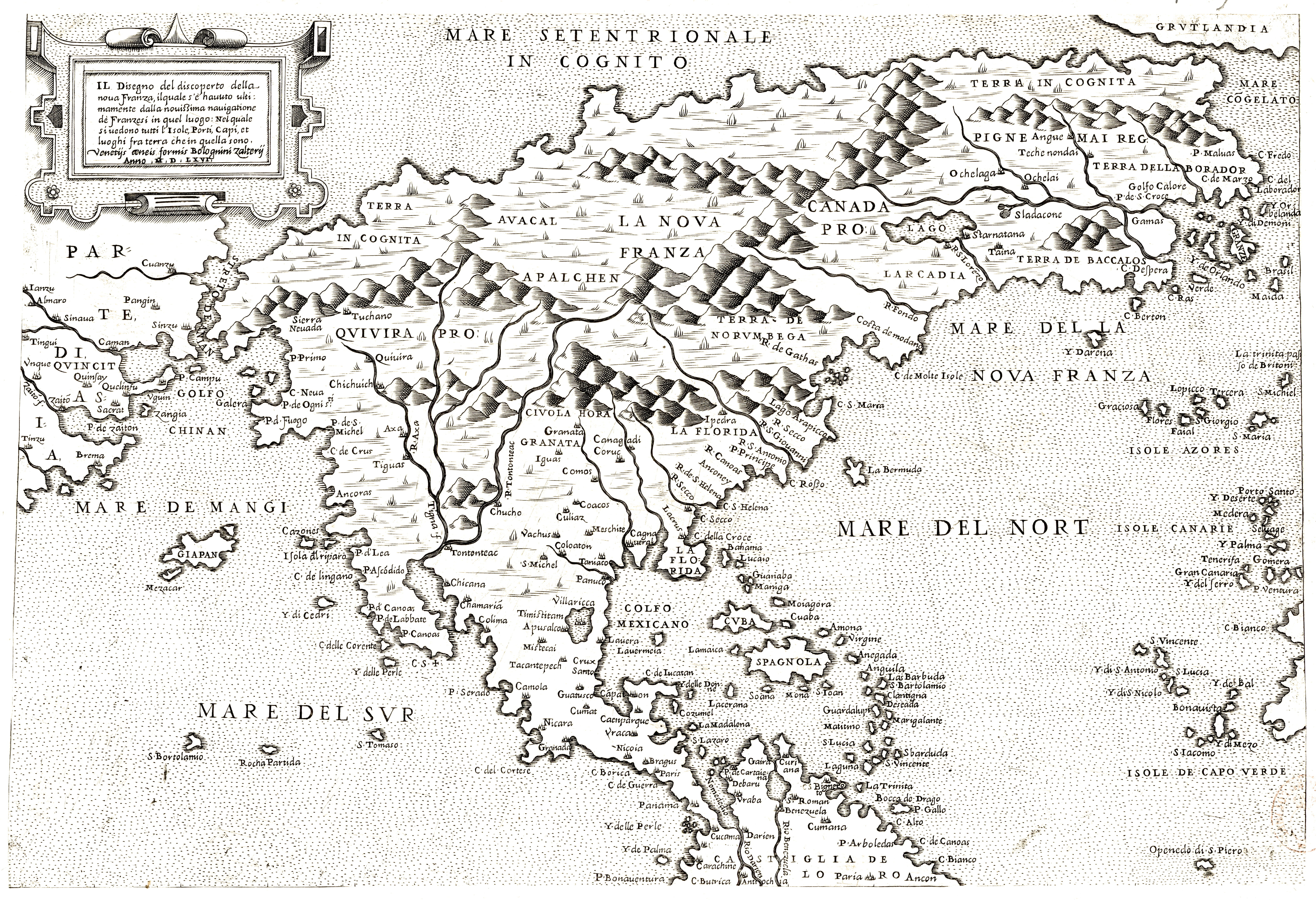
Map of North America from 1566 showing Italian inscriptions, both Terra In Cognita and Mare In Cognito

Terra incognita or terra ignota (Latin 'unknown land'; incognita is stressed on its second syllable in Latin, but with variation in pronunciation in English) is a term used in cartography for regions that have not been mapped or documented. The expression is believed to be first seen in Ptolemy's Geography c. 150. The term was reintroduced in the 15th century from the rediscovery of Ptolemy's work during the Age of Discovery. The equivalent on French maps would be terres inconnues (plural form), and some English maps may show Parts Unknown. Similarly, uncharted or unknown seas would be labeled mare incognitum, Latin for "unknown sea".

== Details ==
Popular belief holds that cartographers used to label such regions with "Here be dragons". Although cartographers did claim that fantastic beasts (including large serpents) existed in remote corners of the world and depicted them as decoration on their maps, only one known surviving map, the Hunt–Lenox Globe, in the collection of the New York Public Library, actually says "Here are dragons" (using the Latin form HIC SVNT DRACONES). Nonetheless, ancient Roman and medieval cartographers used the phrase HIC SVNT LEONES ("Here are lions") when denoting unknown territories on maps.

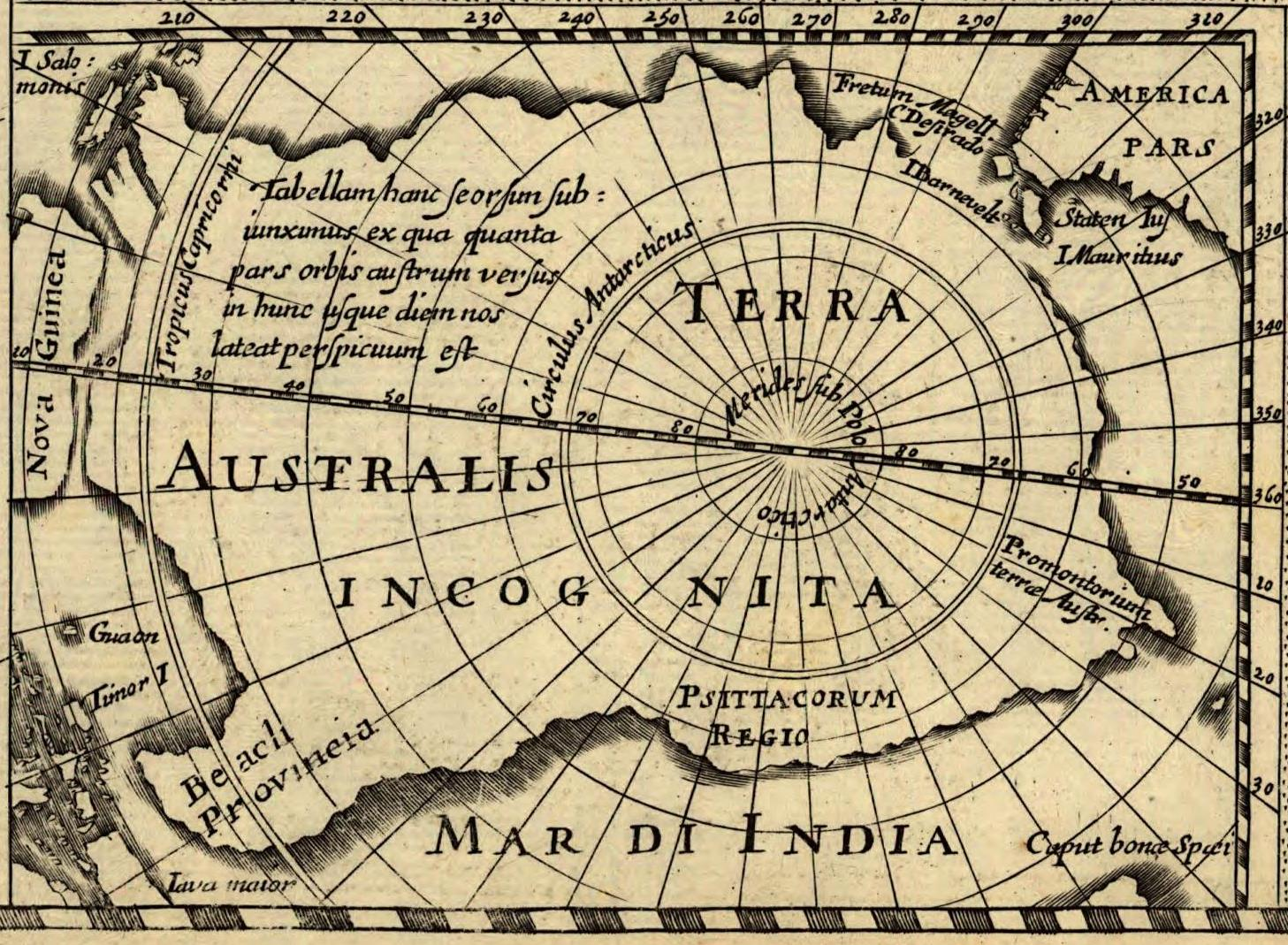
Terra Australis Incognita on a 1618 map

Alternatively, terra incognita may refer to the hypothesized continent Terra Australis Incognita ("The unknown land of the South"), as seen in the Theatrum Orbis Terrarum map by Abraham Ortelius (1570). During the 19th century, terra incognita disappeared from maps. Both the coastlines and the inner parts of the continents became fully explored, even prior to the advent of aerial photography and satellite imagery in the 20th century; however, the bottoms of the oceans remain mostly unmapped, as do many other land surfaces in the Solar System, and the phrase is now used metaphorically to describe any unexplored subject or field of research. For example, only 40% of the surface of Neptune's moon Triton has been mapped with the remainder being terra incognita.

== Etymology ==
- Terra: Latin for "earth" or "land". Related English words include terrestrial, territory, and terrain.
- Incognita: from Latin cognoscere, "to know, be acquainted with" (negated by the prefix in-), which is related to English know and Greek γνῶσις (gnosis, "knowledge"). Related English words include agnostic, cognition, and gnosticism.

== In media ==
Track 12 of the Ergo Proxy opus 2 soundtrack is titled "Terra Incognita".

The song "The Sticks" from Mother Mother’s 2012 album of the same name prominently features the phrase "terra incognita" in its verses.

== See also ==
- Early world maps – List of early depictions of the world
- Fantasy map – Study and creation of maps of imagined places or events
- History of cartography – Evolution of the art and science of mapmaking
- List of lost lands – Islands or continents supposedly existing during prehistory, having since disappeared
- Mappa mundi – Medieval European maps of the world
- Vigia (nautical) – Warning on a nautical chart indicating an unsurveyed potential hazard
- Terra nullius – Principle of international law
