= Hunt–Lenox Globe =

1504 terrestrial globe

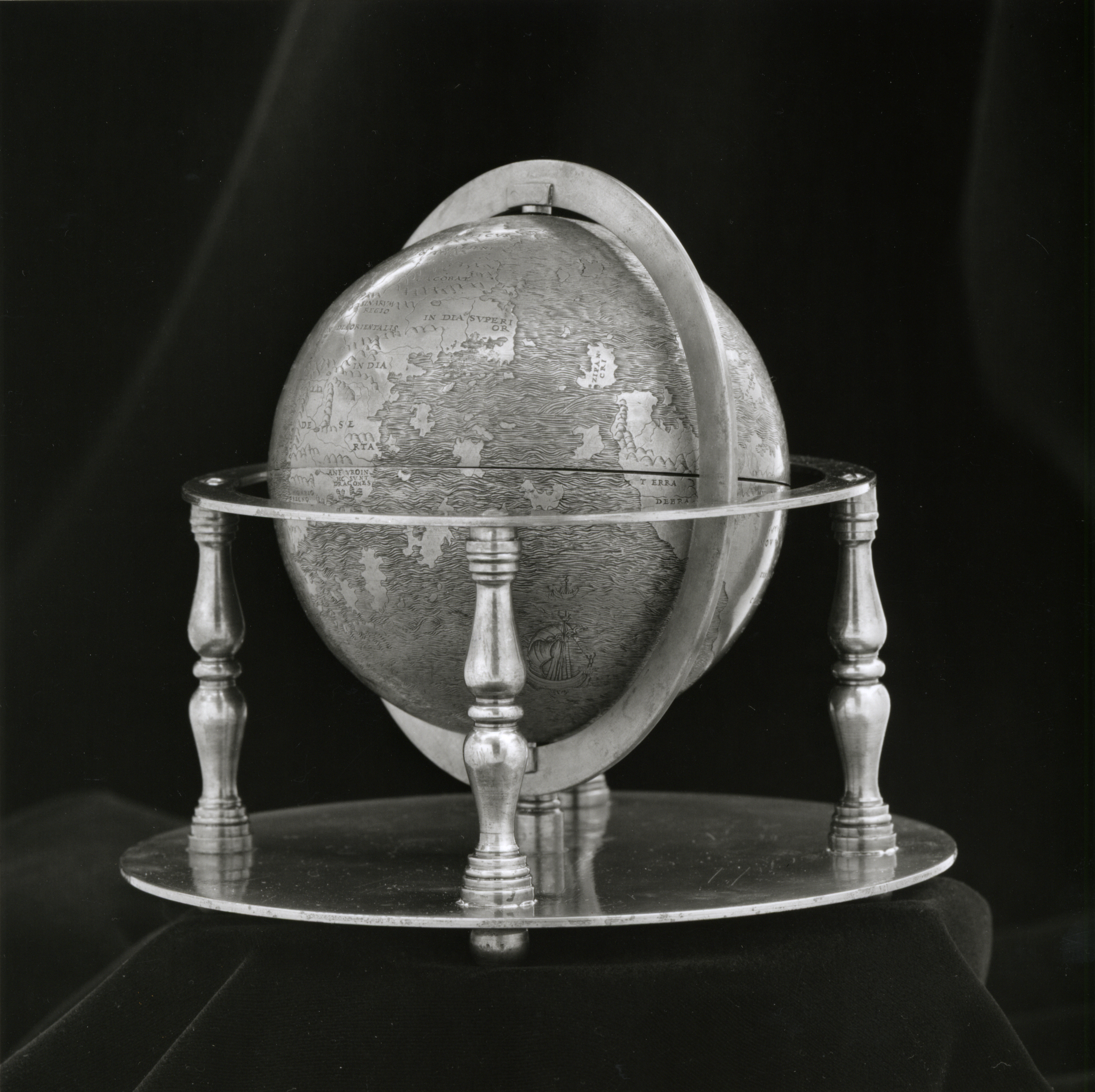
The Lenox Globe

The Hunt–Lenox Globe or Lenox Globe, dating from about 1508, is the second-oldest known terrestrial globe after the Erdapfel of Martin Behaim (1492) or, according to a fringe theory, the third-oldest after the Erdapfel and the Ostrich Egg Globe (claimed 1504). The Hunt–Lenox Globe is housed by the Rare Book Division of the New York Public Library. It is notable as the only known example of an historical map actually using the phrase HC SVNT DRACONES (Latin, "here are dragons").

== Description ==
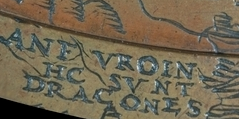
Close-up of the text 'Hic Sunt Dracones'

The Lenox Globe is a hollow red copper globe without any green or black patina that measures ca. 112 millimetres (ca. 4.4 in) in diameter. The phrase HIC SVNT DRACONES appears just below the equator on the eastern coast of Asia.

== Background ==
The globe was purchased in Paris in 1855 by architect Richard Morris Hunt, who gave it to James Lenox, whose collection became part of the New York Public Library, where the globe still resides.

In his recollections, Henry Stevens recalled seeing the globe while dining with Hunt in 1870. Hunt was ambivalent about the globe, which he bought "for a song", and was allowing his children to toy with it. Stevens recognized its value and urged Hunt to store it in the Lenox Library, which he was designing at the time. Stevens also borrowed the globe to ascertain its age with the help of Julius Erasmus Hilgard, who worked for the Coast Survey—a predecessor to the US National Geodetic Survey.

Stefaan Missinne, since 2012 the owner and investigator of the Ostrich Egg Globe, proposed the fringe theory that in fact the Hunt–Lenox Globe was not engraved at all, but was cast from the Ostrich Egg Globe "using a very specific and unusual technique" before the two halves of the egg globe were joined.

== Publications ==
The Lenox Globe, by B.F. De Costa

The earliest known article on the globe was written by B. F. de Costa for the Magazine of American History in September 1879. Gabriel Gravier reprinted the article with additional comments in the Bulletin de la société normande de géographie later that year.

However, neither article links hic sunt dracones to dragons. Da Costa writes:

In this region [China, called East India on the globe], near the equatorial line, is seen "Hc Svnt Dracones", or here are the Dagroians, described by Marco Polo as living in the Kingdom of "Dagroian". These people... feasted upon the dead and picked their bones (B.II. c.14, Ramusio's ed.)

In his translation of Da Costa's article, Gabriel Gravier adds that Marco Polo's Kingdom of Dagroian is in Java Minor, or Sumatra, well away from the spot indicated on the Lenox Globe.

De Costa noted a large, unnamed land mass depicted in the southern part of the Eastern Hemisphere on the Lenox Globe and suggested, “with extreme diffidence”, that this land represented Australia, misplaced to this location. If so, he said, “it would be necessary to conclude that, although misplaced upon the Lenox Globe, Australia was known to the geographers of that early period”.

The flat drawing of the globe which accompanied the early articles is reproduced as map 7 in Emerson D. Fite and Archibald Freeman's A Book of Old Maps Delineating American History (New York: Dover Reprints, 1969), and as figure 43 in A. E. Nordenskiöld's Facsimile-Atlas to the Early History of Cartography (New York: Dover Reprints, 1973).

The New York Public Library provides high resolution scans of the globe on their website.

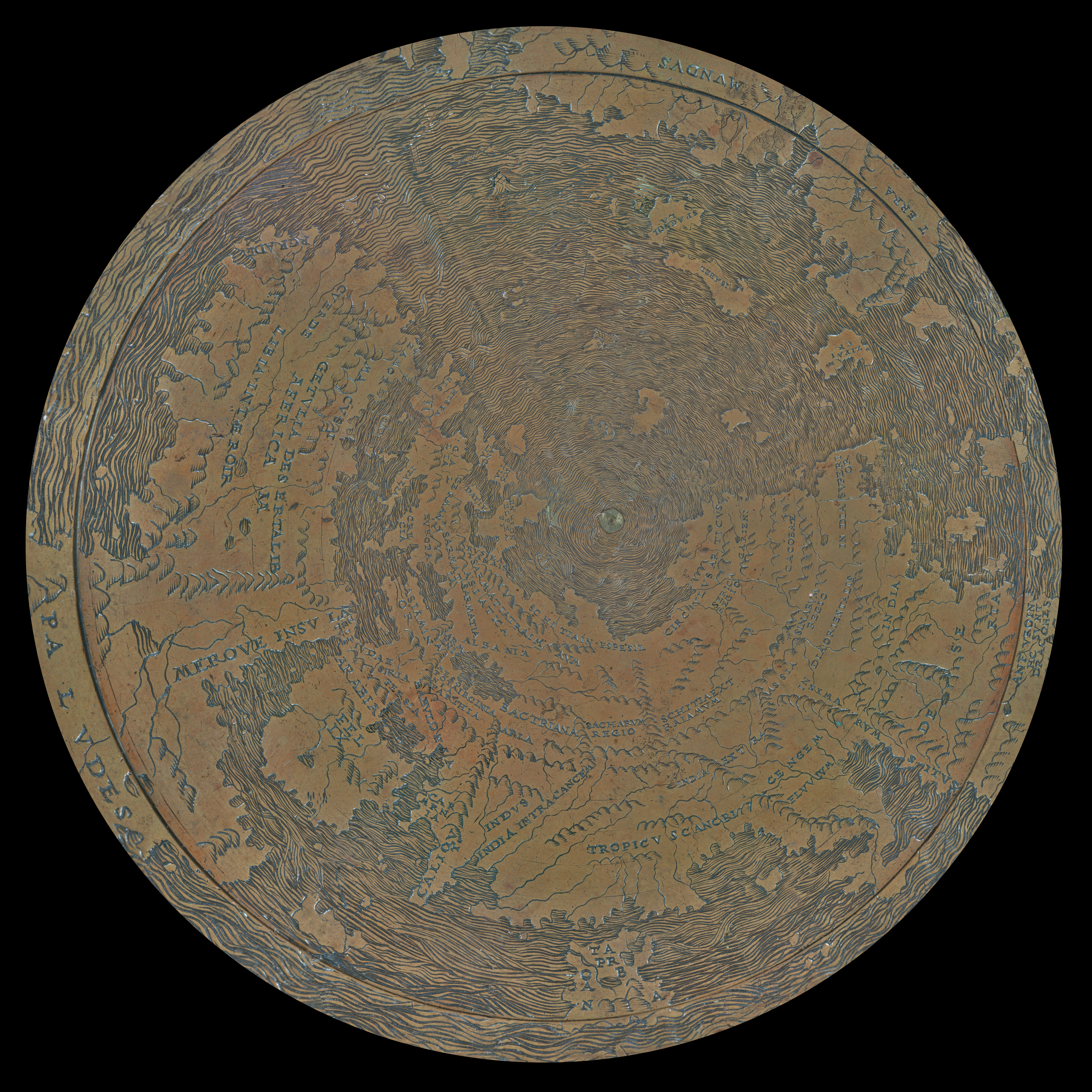
Northern hemisphere

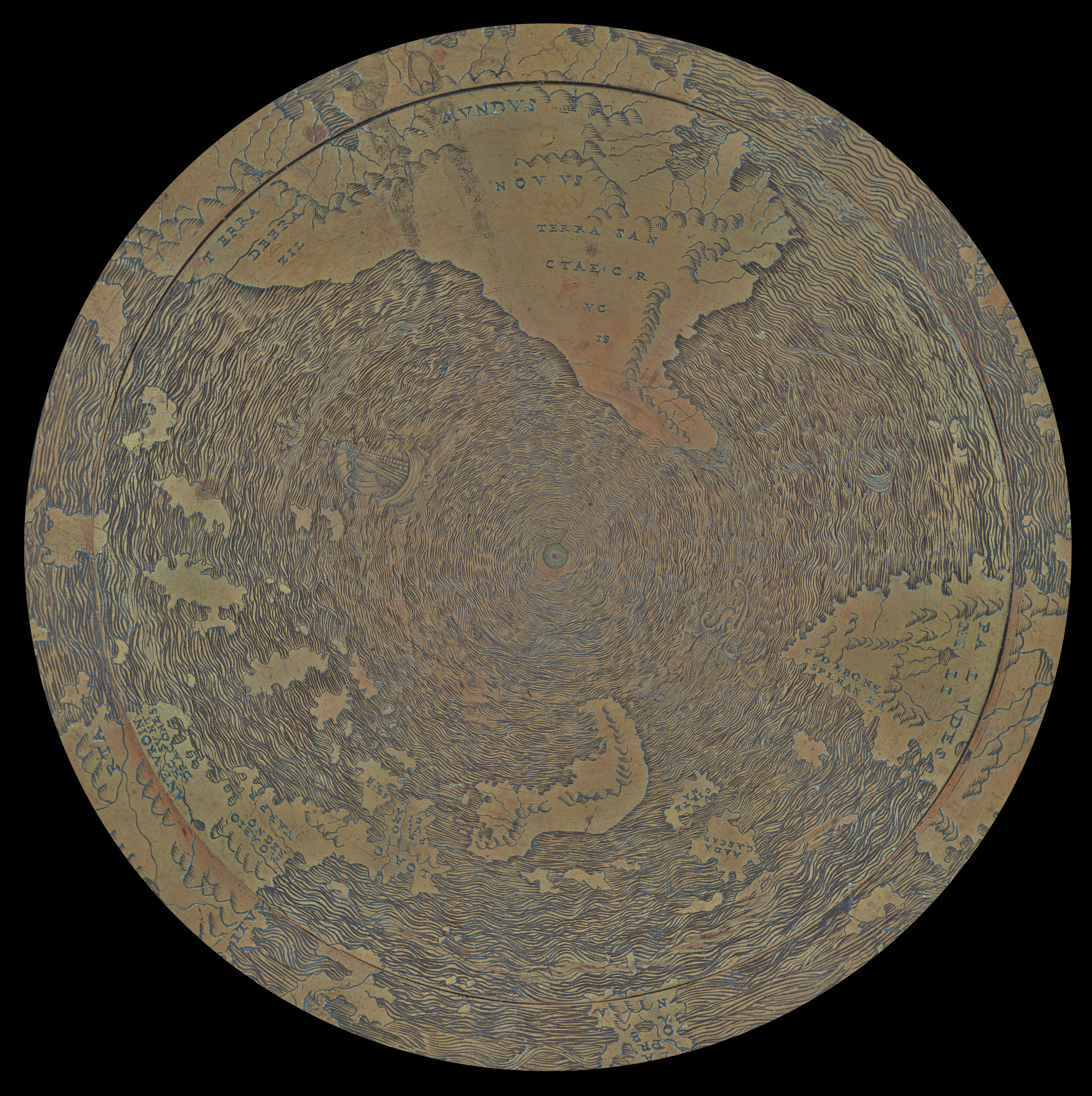
Southern hemisphere
