= Timeline of Norse colonization of the Americas =

Chronology of Norse activity in the Americas

== Prehistoric settlement ==
Map of the Americas showing pre Clovis sites.

It's widely accepted that humans first arrived by the Beringia Land bridge, some estimates claiming this occurred as early as 43,000 years ago.

== Norse colonization ==
- c. 1000: Erik the Red and Leif Ericson, Viking navigators, discovered and settled Greenland, Helluland (possibly Baffin Island), Markland (now called Labrador), and Vinland (now called Newfoundland). The Greenland colony lasted until the 15th century.
- c. 1350: The Norse Western Settlement in Greenland was abandoned.
- 1354: King Magnus of Sweden and Norway authorised Paul Knutson to lead an expedition to Greenland which may never have taken place.
- c.1450–1480s: The Norse Eastern Settlement in Greenland was abandoned during the opening stages of the Little Ice Age.

== Other sources ==
- Seaver, Kirsten A. (1996). The Frozen Echo: Greenland and the Exploration of North America, Ca. A.D. 1000-1500. Stanford University Press. ISBN 978-0-8047-3161-4.
