= Ostrich Egg Globe =

Hollow terrestrial globe

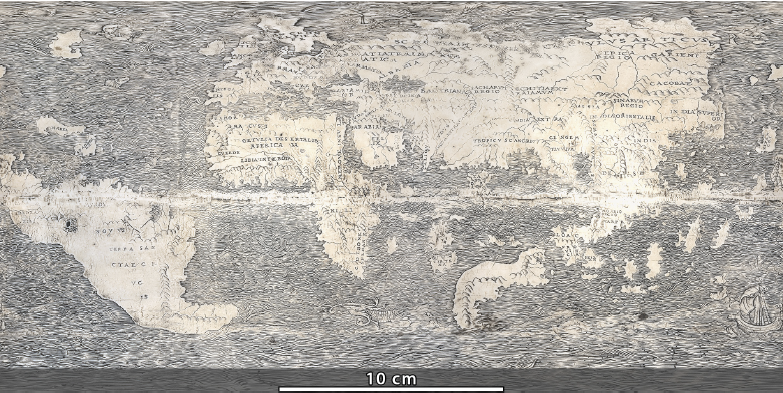
Mundus Novus depicted on the globe

The Ostrich Egg Globe is a hollow terrestrial globe purportedly made from the conjoined lower halves of two ostrich eggs. The map carved on the globe is an extremely close, if not identical, match to the Hunt–Lenox Globe, a copper globe reliably dated to about 1510. The owner of the Ostrich Egg Globe, Stefaan Missinne, claims that it was made in the early 16th century and would therefore be the first globe ever to depict the New World. Various researchers do not support Missinne's claims, pointing to X-ray images of the globe and mistakes around the globe's equator.

== Missinne's theories ==
The globe's primary investigator, Stefaan Missinne, claimed in 2013 that the globe had been "found" at the London Map Fair in 2012, by an owner who preferred to remain anonymous; that it had passed through at least two dealers' hands already; and that it "had been part of an important European collection for many decades" before that.

Missinne further claimed that the remarkable similarity between the maps on the Hunt–Lenox Globe and the Ostrich Egg Globe indicated that contrary to popular belief, "the Lenox Globe was not engraved, but rather cast from the ostrich egg globe using a very specific and unusual technique," and that in fact this casting process must have happened before the two halves of the Ostrich Egg Globe were joined, giving the Ostrich Egg Globe effectively the same age as the Hunt–Lenox Globe.

Further, in 2013, Missinne claimed that the globe showed "influence from Leonardo's workshop." By 2017 claimed that the globe was crafted in precisely 1504 by a left-handed engraver whom Missinne identifies as Leonardo da Vinci himself.

In 2018, Missinne published a book titled The Da Vinci Globe (the title a reference to The Da Vinci Code (2003)) promoting his theory of the globe's provenance. Cartographer Wouter Bracke, reviewing The Da Vinci Globe in 2019, stated that Missine's book should be considered "a report on the author's research into the globe and [not] a final scientific and academic publication," and that Cambridge Scholars Publishing's lack of editorial board "clearly failed to guide the author in the preparation of his publication." Ultimately, while Bracke seems to accept the idea that the Ostrich Egg Globe is a true product of the "early 16th century," he states that more research is needed into its provenance and recent history.

Missinne was expelled from the International Coronelli Society for the Study of Globes in 2024 after he disparaged scientists who had contradicted his theories.

== Criticism of Missinne's theories ==
An international research team dealing with the question of the globe's authenticity concluded that the globe is a synthetic replica, presumably made during a facsimile campaign of the Hunt-Lenox Globe in 1984-1985. The X-ray images published by Missinne shows no pores, according to the research team, which should be present on ostrich eggs. Moreover, the Ostrich Egg Globe shows "hundreds of mistakes" around the equator, consistent with later facsimiles, and absent on the Hunt-Lenox Globe.

== See also ==
- Erdapfel – Oldest extant terrestrial globe (1490~1492)
