= Here be dragons =

Phrase used on maps to indicate uncharted areas

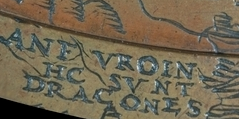
The text Hic Sunt Dracones on the Hunt–Lenox Globe, dating from 1504

Here be dragons (Latin: hic sunt dracones) is a phrase used to indicate dangerous or unexplored territories, in imitation of a medieval practice of putting illustrations of dragons, sea monsters and other mythological creatures on uncharted areas of maps where potential dangers were thought to exist.

== History ==
Although several early maps, such as the Theatrum Orbis Terrarum, have illustrations of mythological creatures for decoration, the phrase itself is largely an anachronism. The only known historical use of this phrase, in the Latin form "HIC SUNT DRACONES" (Latin: Hic Sunt Dracones, lit. 'Here Are Dragons'), is on the Hunt-Lenox Globe, dating to 1508. Earlier maps contain a variety of references to mythical and real creatures, but the Lenox Globe is the only known map to bear this phrase. The term appears at the extreme periphery of the Asian continent.

The classical phrase used by medieval cartographers was HIC SUNT LEONES (literally, "here are lions") when denoting unknown territories on maps.

Another variation of the phrase appears in the Carta Marina (1539) and there the phrase is HEC EST HORRRENDA CHARIBDIS [English : This is the terrible Charybdis]

The danger is poetically depicted as a sea-monster but indicates a dangerous whirlpool, the Moskstraumen on the map.

Outside cartography, the phrase became a general term for legal disclaimers that caution against performing potentially dangerous actions.

== Dragons on maps ==
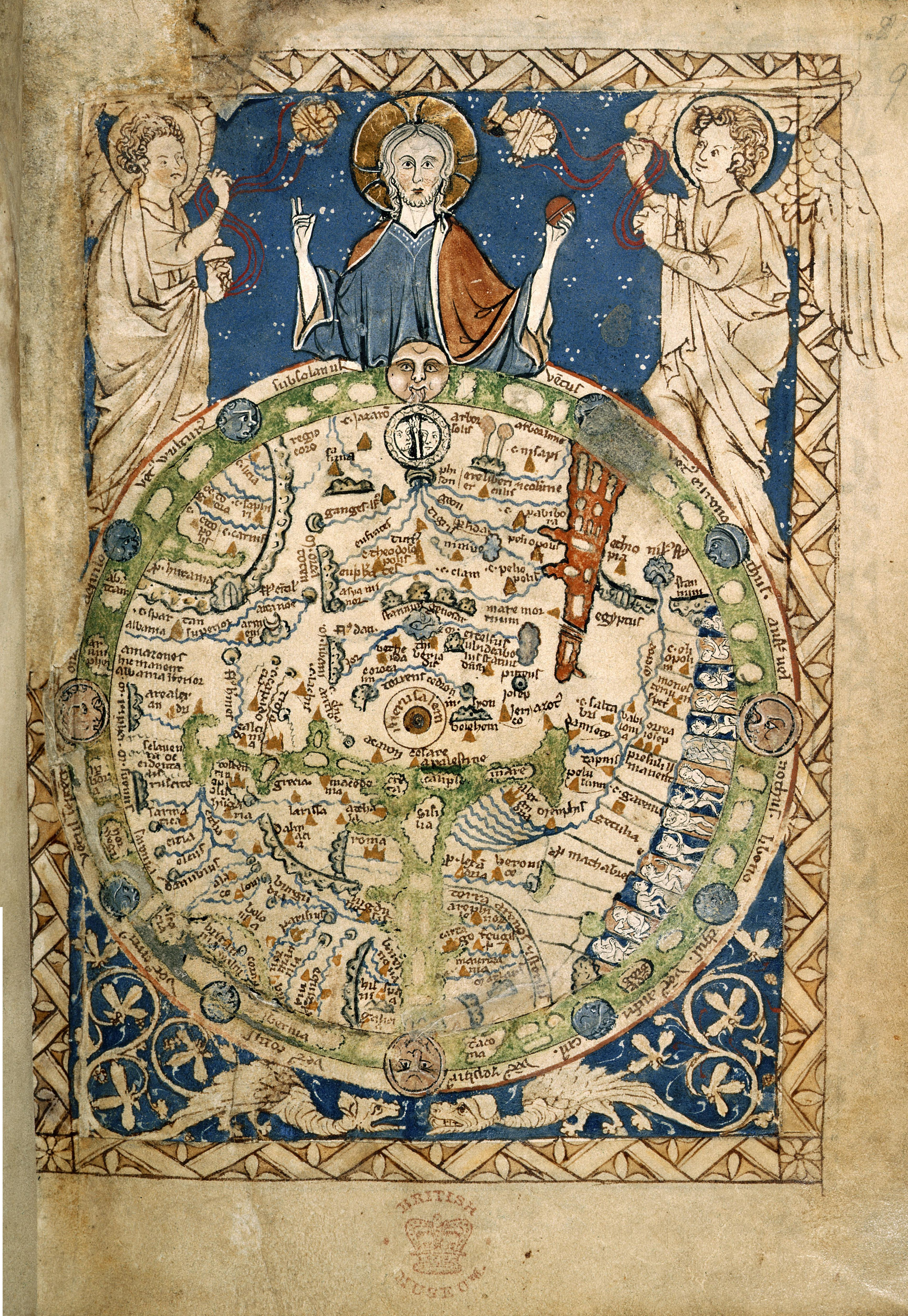
The Psalter world map with dragons at the base

Dragons appear on a few other historical maps:

- The T-O Psalter world map (c. 1250 AD) has dragons, as symbols of sin, in a lower "frame" below the world, balancing Jesus and angels on the top, but the dragons do not appear on the map proper.
- The Borgia map (c. 1430), in the Vatican Library, states, over a dragon-like figure in Asia (in the upper left quadrant of the map), "Hic etiam homines magna cornua habentes longitudine quatuor pedum, et sunt etiam serpentes tante magnitudinis, ut unum bovem comedant integrum". ("Here there are even men who have large four-foot horns, and there are even serpents so large that they could eat an ox whole.")
- The Fra Mauro Map (c. 1450) shows the "Island of Dragons" (Italian: Isola de' dragoni), an imaginary island in the Atlantic Ocean. In an inscription near Herat in modern-day Afghanistan, Fra Mauro says that in the mountains nearby "there are a number of dragons, in whose forehead is a stone that cures many infirmities", and describes the locals' way of hunting those dragons to get the stones. This is thought to be based on Albertus Magnus's treatise De mineralibus. In an inscription elsewhere on the map, the cartographer expresses his scepticism regarding "serpents, dragons and basilisks" mentioned by "some historiographers".
- A 19th-century Japanese map, the Jishin-no-ben, in the shape of ouroboros, depicts a dragon associated with causing earthquakes.

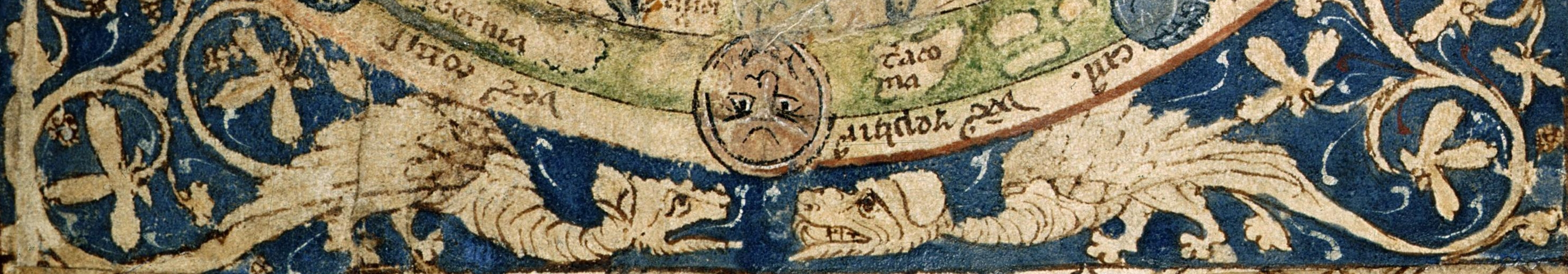
Close-up view of the dragons on the 1265 Psalter world map

== Other creatures on maps ==
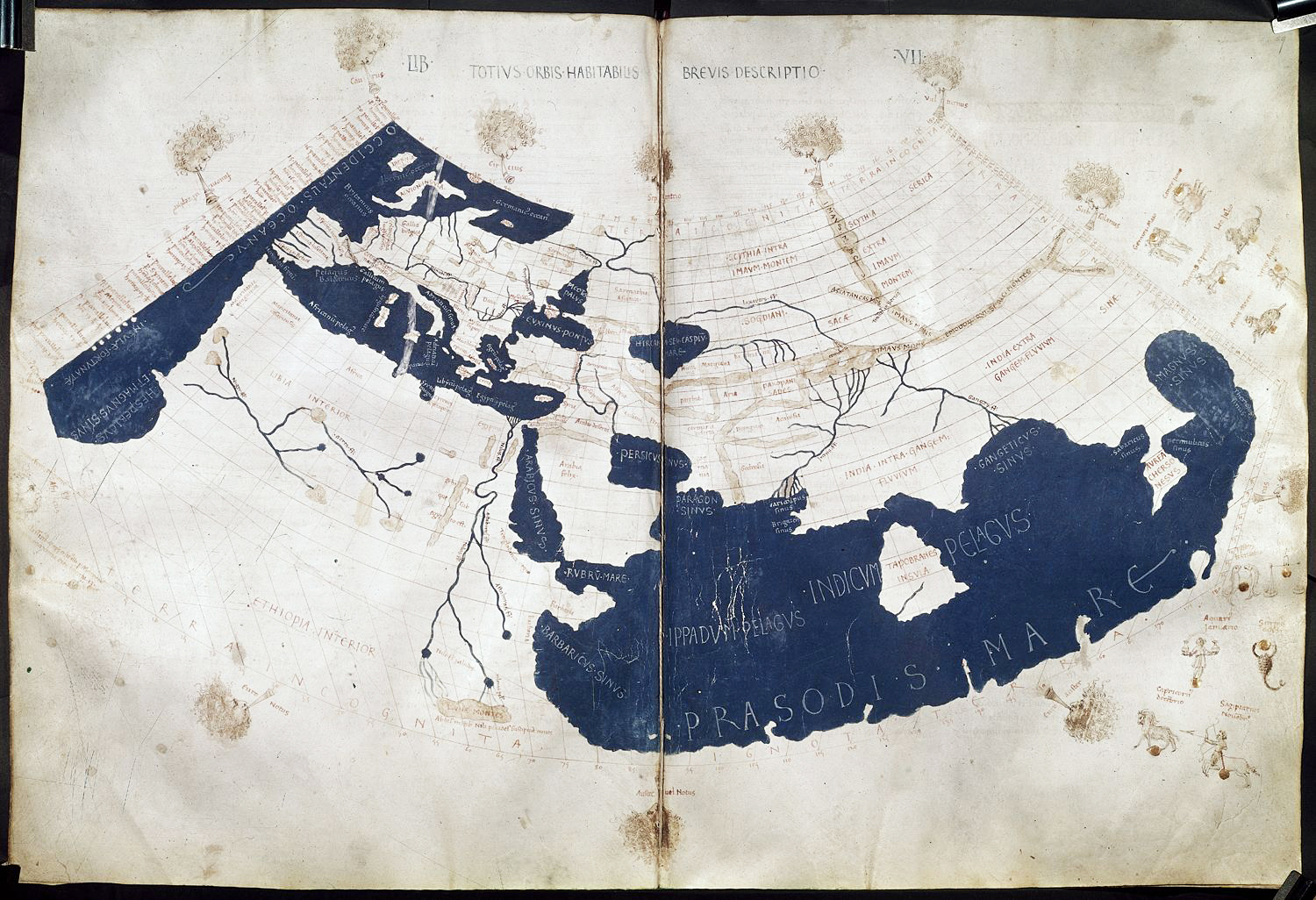
A mid-15th century Florentine map of the world based on Jacobus Angelus's 1406 Latin translation of Maximus Planudes's late-13th century copies of rediscovered Greek manuscripts of Ptolemy's 2nd-century Geography. Ptolemy's 1st (modified conic) projection.

- Ptolemy's atlas in Geographia (originally 2nd century, taken up again in the 15th century) warns of elephants, hippos and cannibals.
- The Tabula Peutingeriana (a medieval copy of Roman map) has "in his locis elephanti nascuntur", "in his locis scorpiones nascuntur" and "hic cenocephali nascuntur" ("in these places elephants are born, in these places scorpions are born, here Cynocephali are born").
- Cotton MS. Tiberius B.V. fol. 56v (10th century), British Library Manuscript Collection, has "hic abundant leones" ("here lions abound"), along with a picture of a lion, near the east coast of Asia (at the top of the map towards the left); this map also has a text-only serpent reference in southernmost Africa (bottom left of the map): "Zugis regio ipsa est et Affrica. est enim fertilis. sed ulterior bestiis et serpentibus plena" ("This region of Zugis is in Africa; it is rather fertile, but on the other hand it is full of beasts and serpents.")
- The Ebstorf map (13th century) has a dragon in the extreme south-eastern part of Africa, together with an asp and a basilisk.
- Giovanni Leardo's map (1442) has, in southernmost Africa, "Dixerto dexabitado p. chaldo e p. serpent".
- Martin Waldseemüller's Carta marina navigatoria (1516) has "an elephant-like creature in northernmost Norway, accompanied by a legend explaining that this 'morsus' with two long and quadrangular teeth congregated there", i.e. a walrus, which would have seemed monstrous at the time.
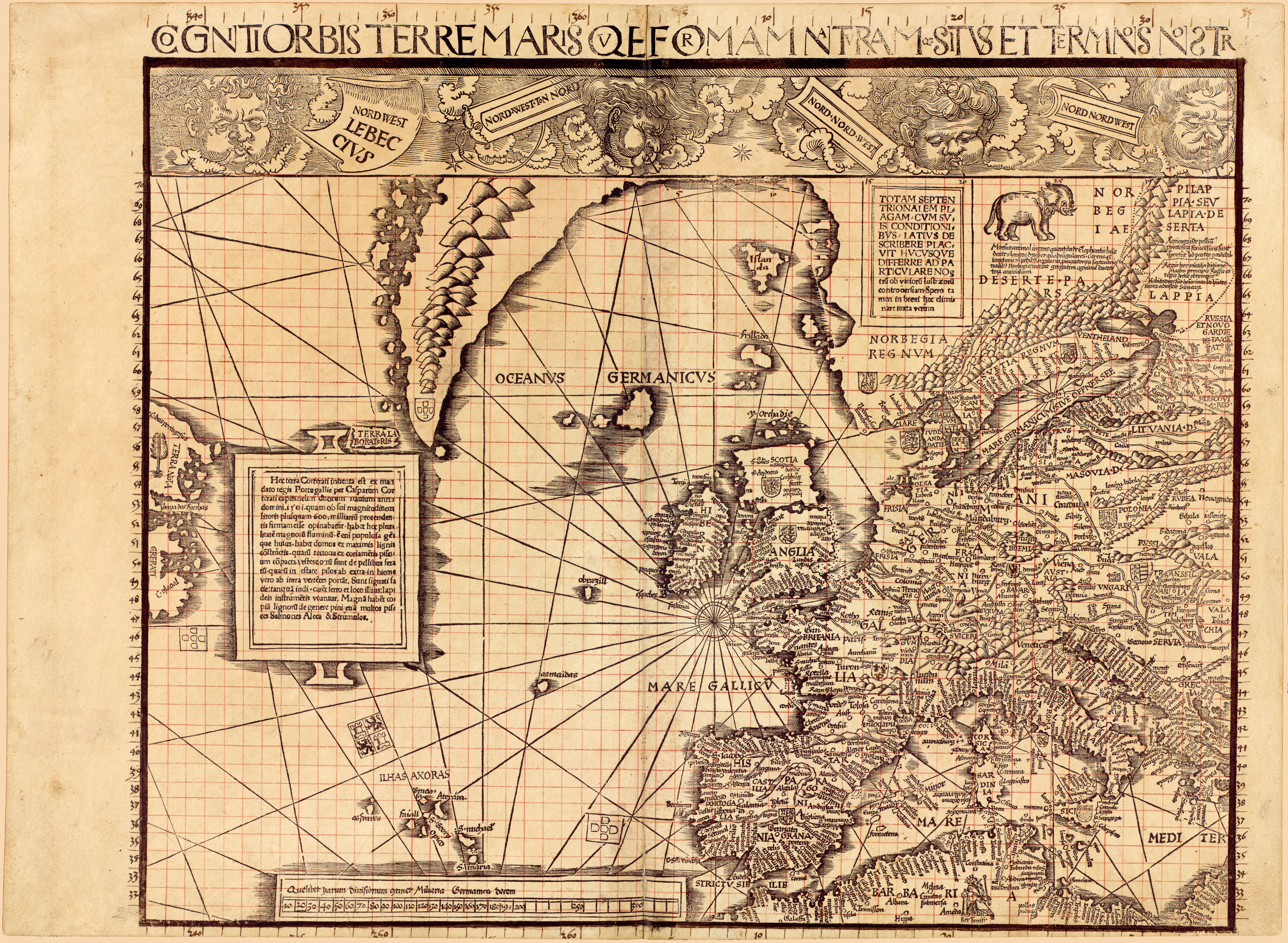
  Martin Waldseemüller's Carta marina navigatoria with a monstrous walrus at top right (1516).
  Waldseemüller's Carta marina navigatoria (1522), revised by Laurentius Fries, has the morsus moved to the Davis Strait.
- Bishop Olaus Magnus's Carta Marina map of Scandinavia (1539) has many monsters in the northern sea, as well as a winged, bipedal, predatory land animal resembling a dragon in northern Lapland.
- On European maps of Africa, up until the Berlin Conference and the subsequent Scramble for Africa produced accurate cartographic representations of Africa, elephants replaced dragons as placeholders for unknown regions. An excerpt from On Poetry: a Rhapsody by the Irish satirist Jonathan Swift states: "So geographers, in Afric maps, With savage pictures fill their gaps, And o'er uninhabitable downs, Place elephants for want of towns".

== See also ==
- Mappa mundi – Medieval European maps of the world
- Terra incognita – "Unknown land", area not mapped by cartographers
