= Albrecht Glockendon II =

German painter

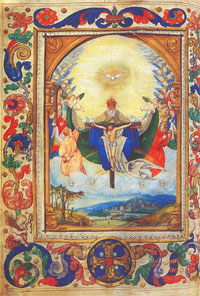
The Holy Trinity by Albrecht Glockendon the Younger, between 1520-1530

Albrecht Glockendon II (also called "the Elder" or "the Younger"; c. 1500 – 1545) was a Nuremberg-based miniaturist and woodcutter. The son of painter and printer Georg Glockendon, his work reflects the influence of both his brother, the illuminator Nikolaus Glockendon, and of Albrecht Dürer.
