= Behaim Globe =

Oldest extant terrestrial globe (1490~1492)

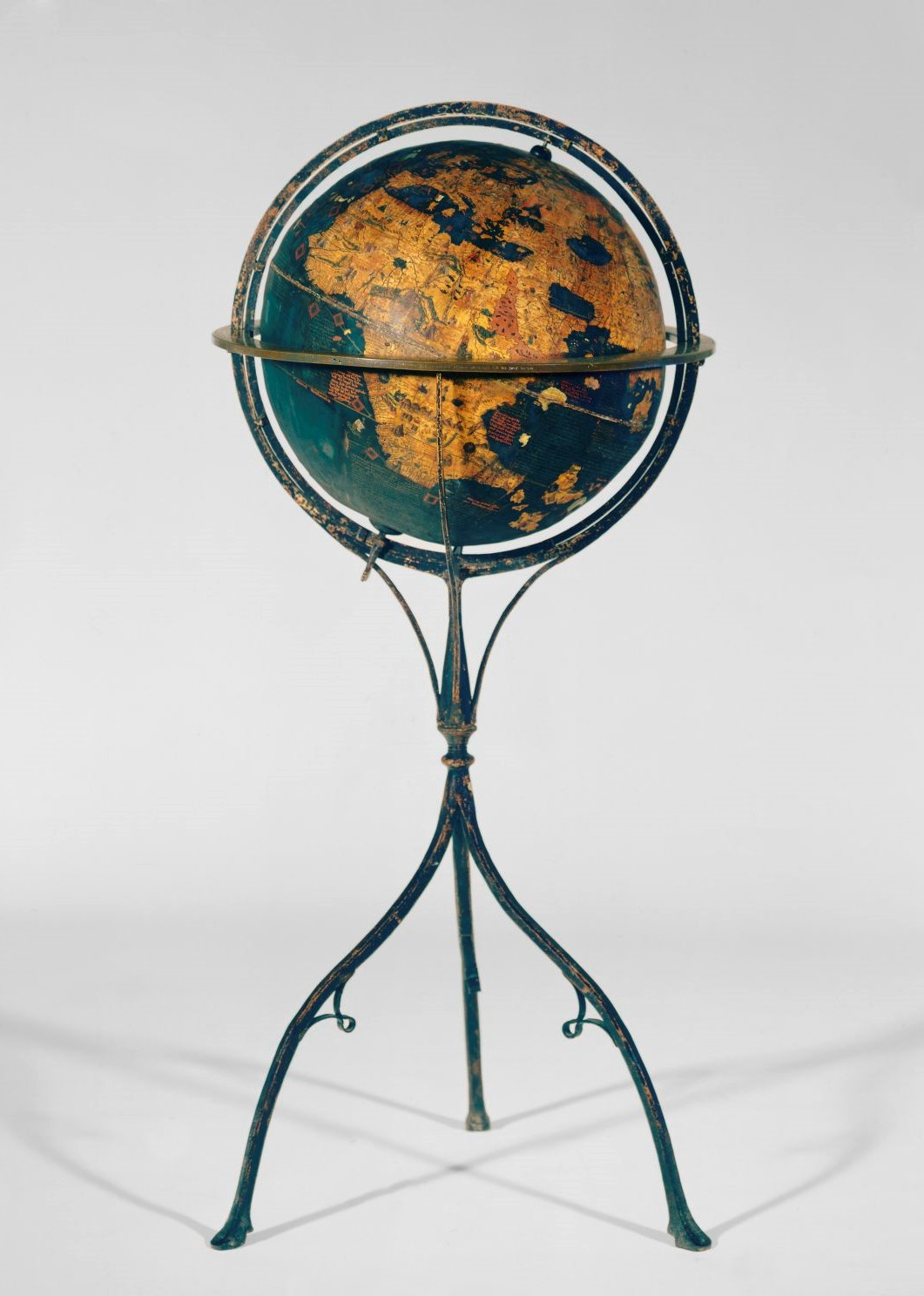
Behaim-Globe, Germanisches Nationalmuseum, Nuremberg, height 133 cm (52 in)

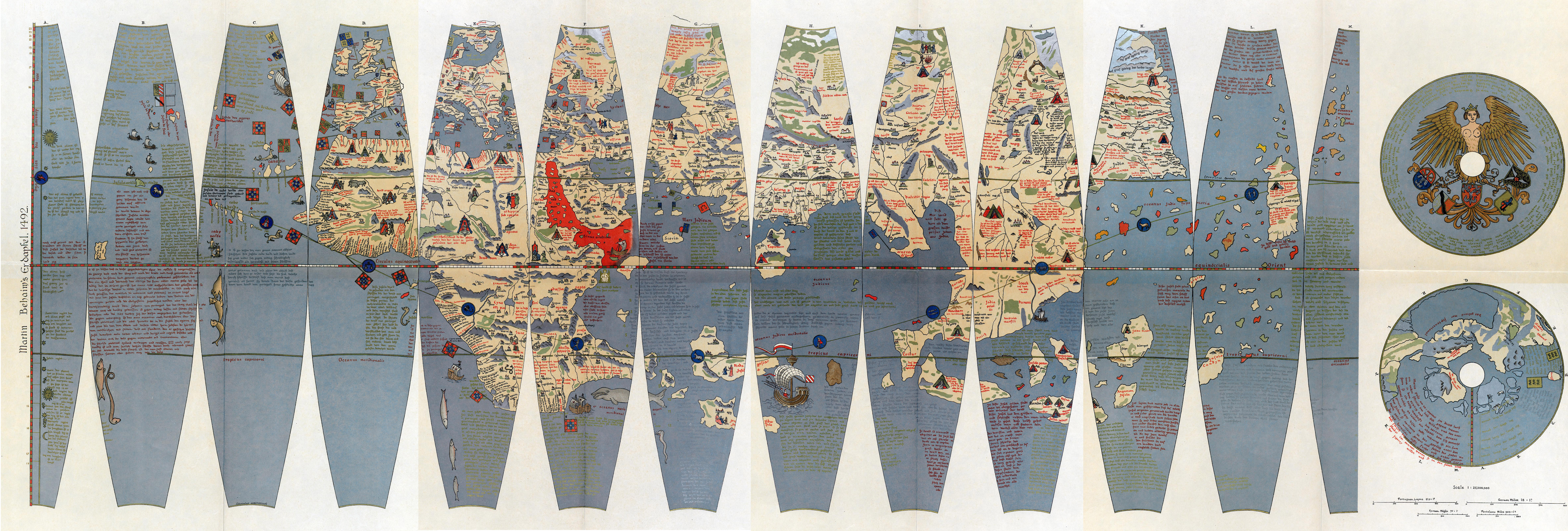
Modern recreation of the gores of the Erdapfel

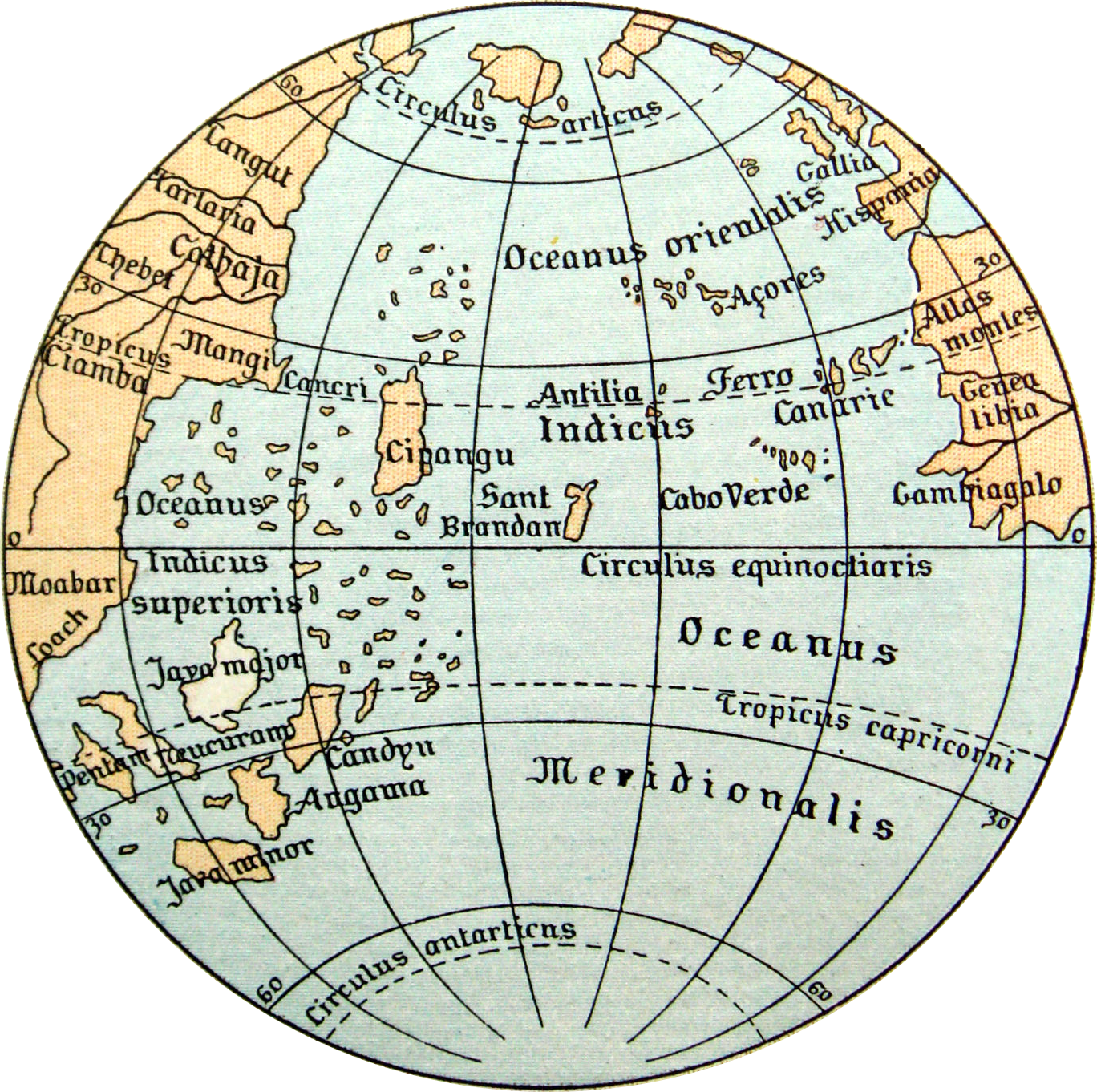
Oceanic area described on the Martin Behaim globe.

The Behaim Globe, also known as the Erdapfel (German for 'earth apple'), (Note: pronounced [ˈeːɐ̯tˌʔapfl̩]) is a terrestrial globe 51 cm (20 in) in diameter, produced by Martin Behaim from 1490 to 1492. It is the oldest extant terrestrial globe, constructed of a laminated linen ball in two halves, reinforced with wood and overlaid with a map painted on gores by Georg Glockendon. These intricate details were based on navigational charts by Jorge de Aguiar, incorporating paper maps meticulously pasted onto a parchment layer encircling the globe.

The Americas are not included, as Columbus returned to Spain no sooner than March 1493. The globe shows an enlarged Eurasian continent and an empty ocean between Europe and Asia. The mythical Saint Brendan's Island is included. Cipangu (Japanese archipelago) is oversized and well south of its true position; Martellus's map is followed in developing an enormous phantom peninsula east of the Golden Chersonese (Malay Peninsula).

The idea to call the globe "apple" may be related to the Reichsapfel ("Imperial Apple", Globus cruciger) which was also kept in Nuremberg along with the Imperial Regalia (Reichskleinodien). This use of the word Erdapfel is unrelated to its modern use in southern Germany and Austria to refer to potatoes.

From its creation until early in the 16th century, it stood in a reception room in the Nuremberg town hall. After that time, it was held by the Behaim family. In 1907, it was transferred to the Germanic Museum in Nuremberg where it is currently on display. In 1992, it was moved for some time to the Vienna University of Technology, to be studied at high resolution by the Behaim Digital Globe Project. In 2011, a second digitalization by the German National Museum began.

Terrestrial globes are known to have been made from antiquity, such as The Globe of Crates. None are known to have survived, even as fragments. A celestial globe, part of the Farnese Atlas, has survived from the second century AD.

In 2023, Erdapfel was admitted to UNESCO's Memory of the World.

== See also ==
- Cartography
- Early world maps
- Globe Museum
- History of cartography
- Hunt–Lenox Globe
- International Coronelli Society for the Study of Globes
- Ostrich Egg Globe
- Theatrum Orbis Terrarum
