= Martin Behaim =

German cartographer (1459-1507)

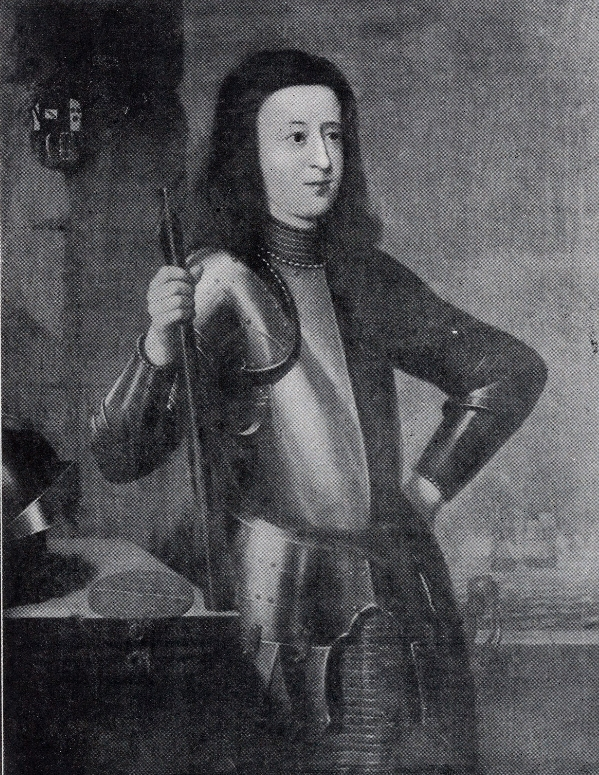
Portrait of Martin Behaim

Martin Behaim (6 October 1459 – 29 July 1507), also known as Martin von Behaim and by various forms of Martin of Bohemia, was a German textile merchant and cartographer. He served John II of Portugal as an adviser in matters of navigation and participated in a voyage to West Africa. He is now best known for his Erdapfel, the world's oldest known globe, which he produced for the Imperial City of Nuremberg in 1492.

== Biography ==
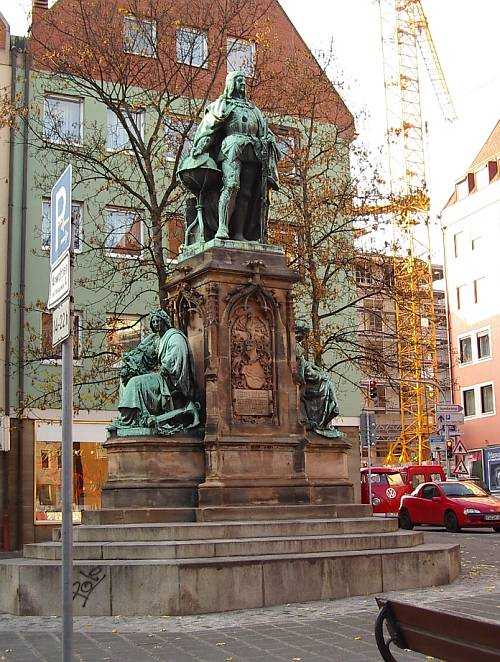
Monument of Martin Behaim in the Theresienplatz, Nuremberg

Behaim was born in Nuremberg on 6 October 1459, the oldest son of Martin Behaim and Agnes Schopper. The elder Martin was a merchant involved in long-distance trade within Europe, including Venice; in 1461 he was elected a senator of Nuremberg. Their son, as a member of a prominent and prosperous family, likely received a good education at one of the best grammar schools in the city. Contrary to later assertions, it is unlikely that he was ever a student of the famous Renaissance mathematician and astronomer, Regiomontanus.

When his father died in 1474, Martin's uncle Leonhard sent him at 15 to Mechelen, Flanders to gain experience as a textile merchant. There he joined the business of Jorius van Dorpp, a vendor of clothing. In 1477 they visited Antwerp where van Dorpp sold his wares to a German merchant; later that same year Behaim attended the Frankfurt fair with Bartels von Eyb, a friend of the family. Writing to his uncle in 1478, Behaim expressed a desire to improve his business prospects by moving to Antwerp, a leading center of the cloth trade. The following year he moved to Antwerp and joined the cloth dye house of Fritz Heberlein, a native of Nuremberg.

In 1484 Behaim moved to Portugal and set up residence in Lisbon. The circumstances behind this move are unclear but Lisbon was the hub of a wide-ranging trade network that included spices, slaves, and gold from Africa and Behaim was likely looking for trading opportunities. He quickly found favor as a counselor in the court of King John II where he supposedly provided advice on navigation and astronomy. However, despite assertions by his early biographers, there is no evidence that Behaim made any significant contributions in these areas. Claims that he taught celestial navigation or introduced the Portuguese to new navigational instruments are belied by the fact that these technologies were already known and used by Portuguese mariners. He may have acted as an importer of scientific instruments, the finest of which were produced at that time in his native town of Nuremberg.

On 18 February 1485 Behaim was knighted by John II, presumably for his contributions as adviser on navigation and astronomy but there is no record of the exact reasons for his honor.

It appears that Behaim participated in a voyage to West Africa around 1485; however it is unlikely that he accompanied Diogo Cão on his second expedition as is sometimes claimed. It is more likely that he participated in a trading voyage to Guinea led by João Afonso de Aveiro.

Following his marriage to Joana de Macedo in 1486, he resided on the Portuguese island of Faial in the Azores, where his father-in-law, Josse van Huerter, was Captain-donatário and leader of the Flemish community. In 1490, Behaim returned to Nuremberg to settle a will case, and remained in the city for three years. He managed to convince leading members of the city council to finance the construction of his famous terrestrial globe under his direction. He returned to Faial in 1493 by way of Flanders and Lisbon, and he remained there until 1506.

Behaim died in the hospice of Saint Bartholomew on 29 July 1507 while visiting Lisbon for business.

== Unsubstantiated claims ==
Numerous assertions have been made regarding Behaim's accomplishments, some made by himself and others by his early biographers. Since the twentieth century, historians have taken a more critical look at these claims and have concluded that many of them are unsubstantiated by any documentary evidence, and in some cases flatly contradicted by existing documentation.

Historian Johann Christoph Wagenseil claimed in 1682 that Behaim had discovered America before Columbus. Other authors say that Behaim at least gave Columbus the idea of sailing west. There is no evidence that Behaim ever sailed west on a voyage of discovery and although it is possible that Behaim and Columbus met in Lisbon, neither Behaim or Columbus ever referenced such a meeting.

Behaim has been hailed as a great mathematician and astronomer but there is no evidence of a scientific education nor are there any extant scientific writings by him. Behaim claimed to be a disciple of the Renaissance mathematician and astronomer, Regiomontanus. Regiomontanus was a neighbor in Nuremberg when Behaim was a boy, but there is no evidence that they ever studied together.

Biographers have claimed that Behaim accompanied Diogo Cão on his second voyage of discovery. Behaim may have contributed to the misunderstanding by leaving a confused account of an African voyage he made in 1485. The fact is that Behaim's dates do not match the dates of this voyage and there is no independent evidence that Behaim sailed with Cão.

Antonio Pigafetta, an Italian writer who accompanied Ferdinand Magellan alleges that Magellan had prior knowledge of a passage to the "Southern Sea" derived from a map made by Behaim. Historians now doubt that Behaim had any direct knowledge of such a passage but he may have depicted mysterious passages in an unknown land which Magellan interpreted as the strait he eventually discovered.

== Behaim globe ==
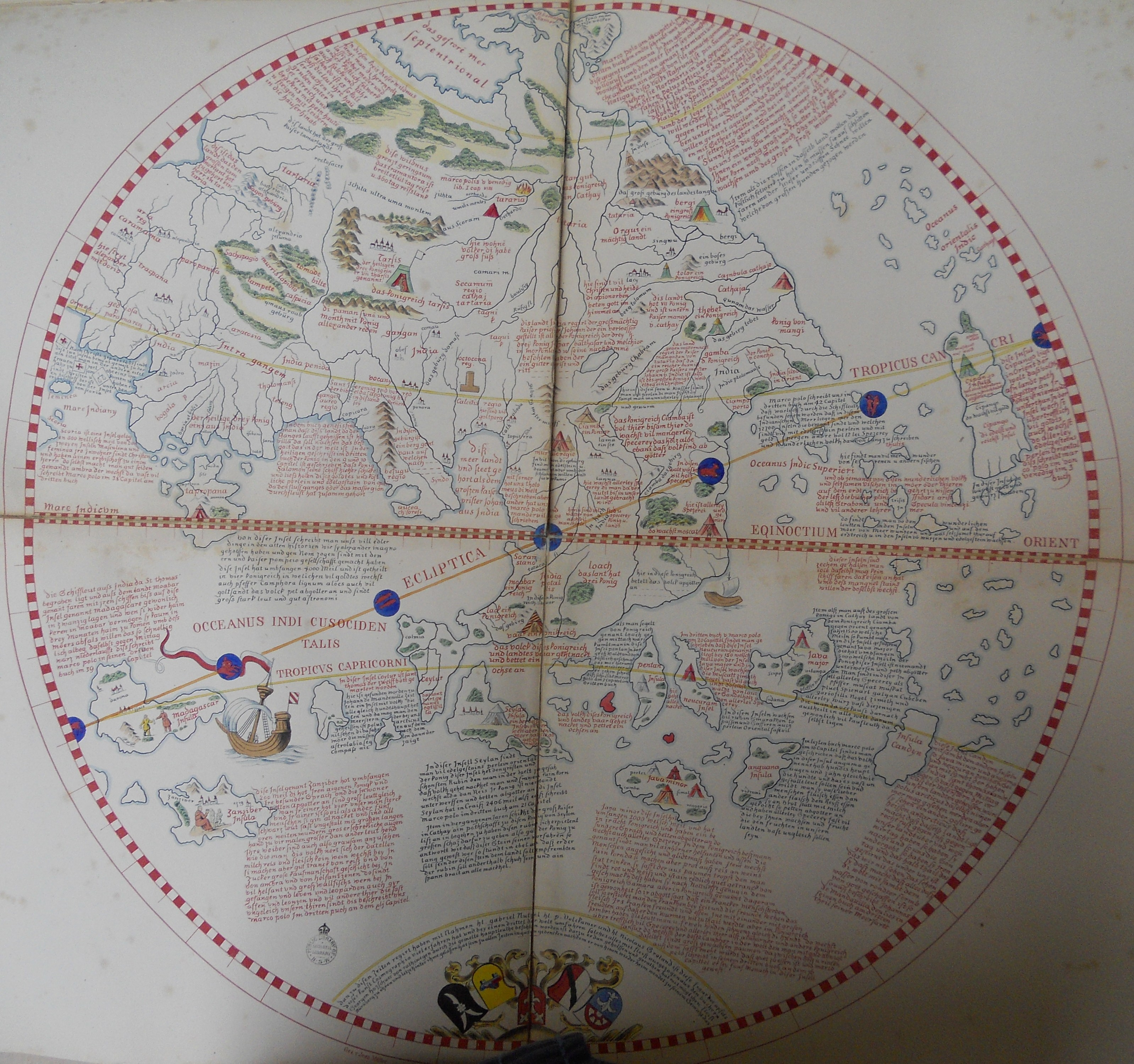
Martin Behaim, eastern hemisphere of his globe made in Nuremberg in 1492. Friedrich Wilhlem Ghillany, Geschichte des Seefahrers Ritter Martin Behaim, Nürnberg, Bauer und Raspe, J. Merz, 1853.

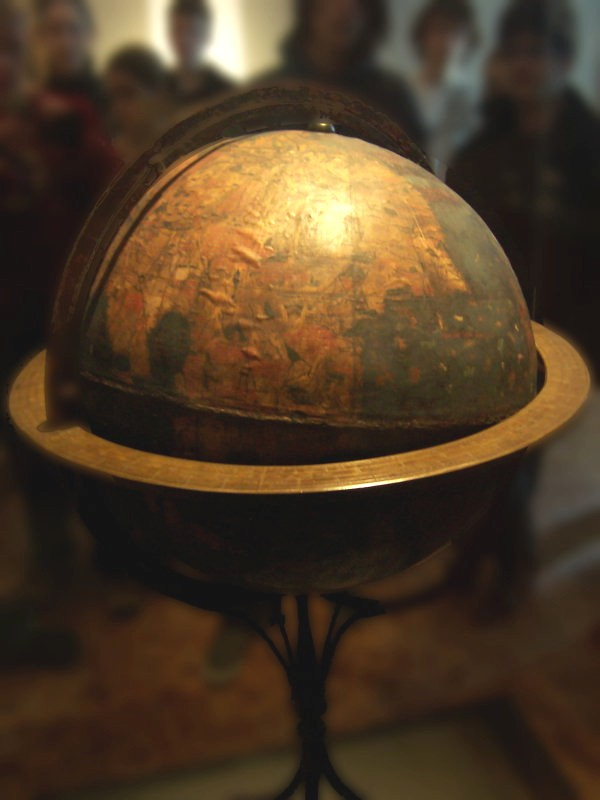
The Nuremberg Globe of Martin Behaim

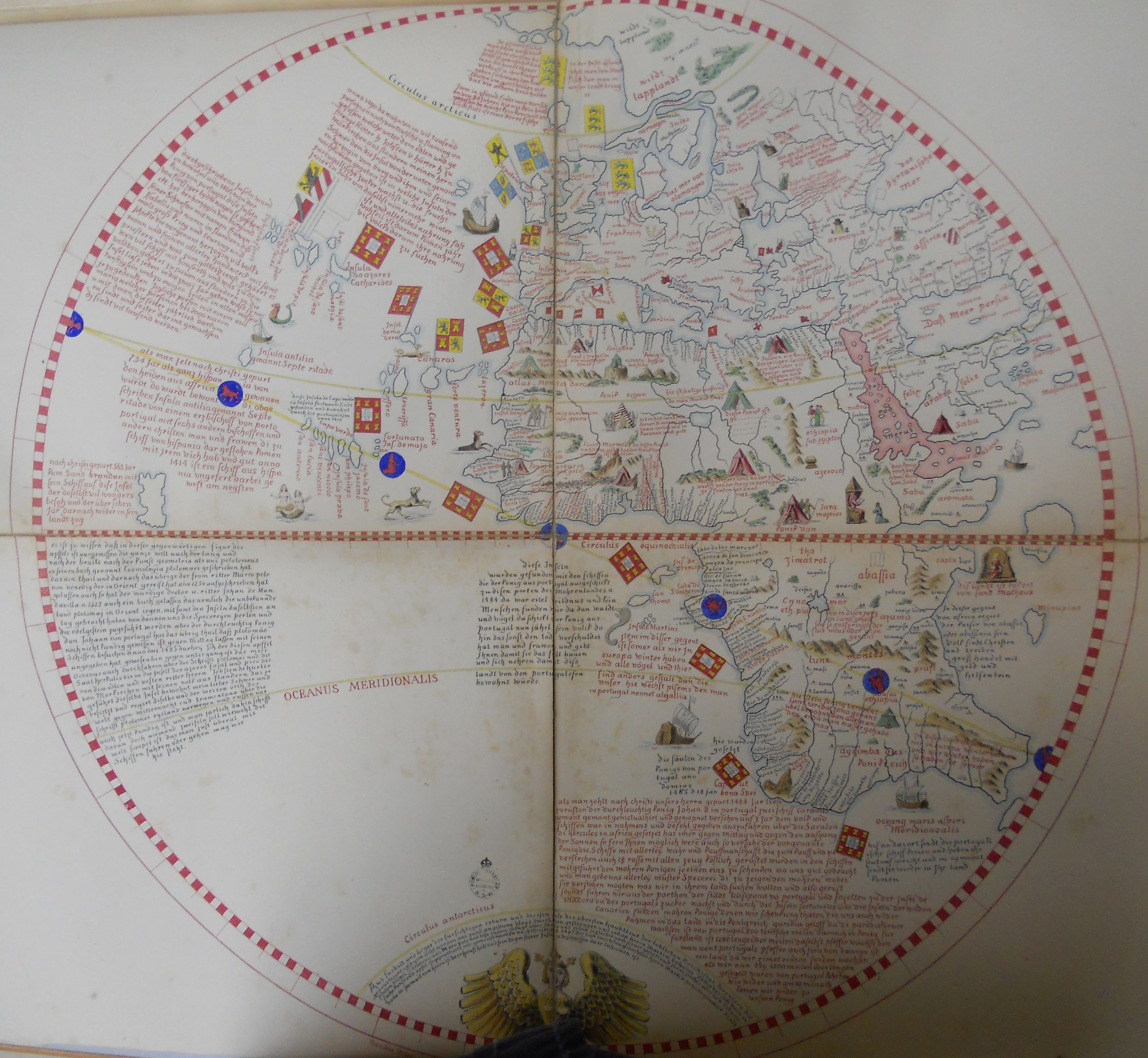
Martin Behaim, western hemisphere of his globe made in Nuremberg in 1492. Friedrich Wilhlem Ghillany, Geschichte des Seefahrers Ritter Martin Behaim, Nürnberg, Bauer und Raspe, J. Merz, 1853.

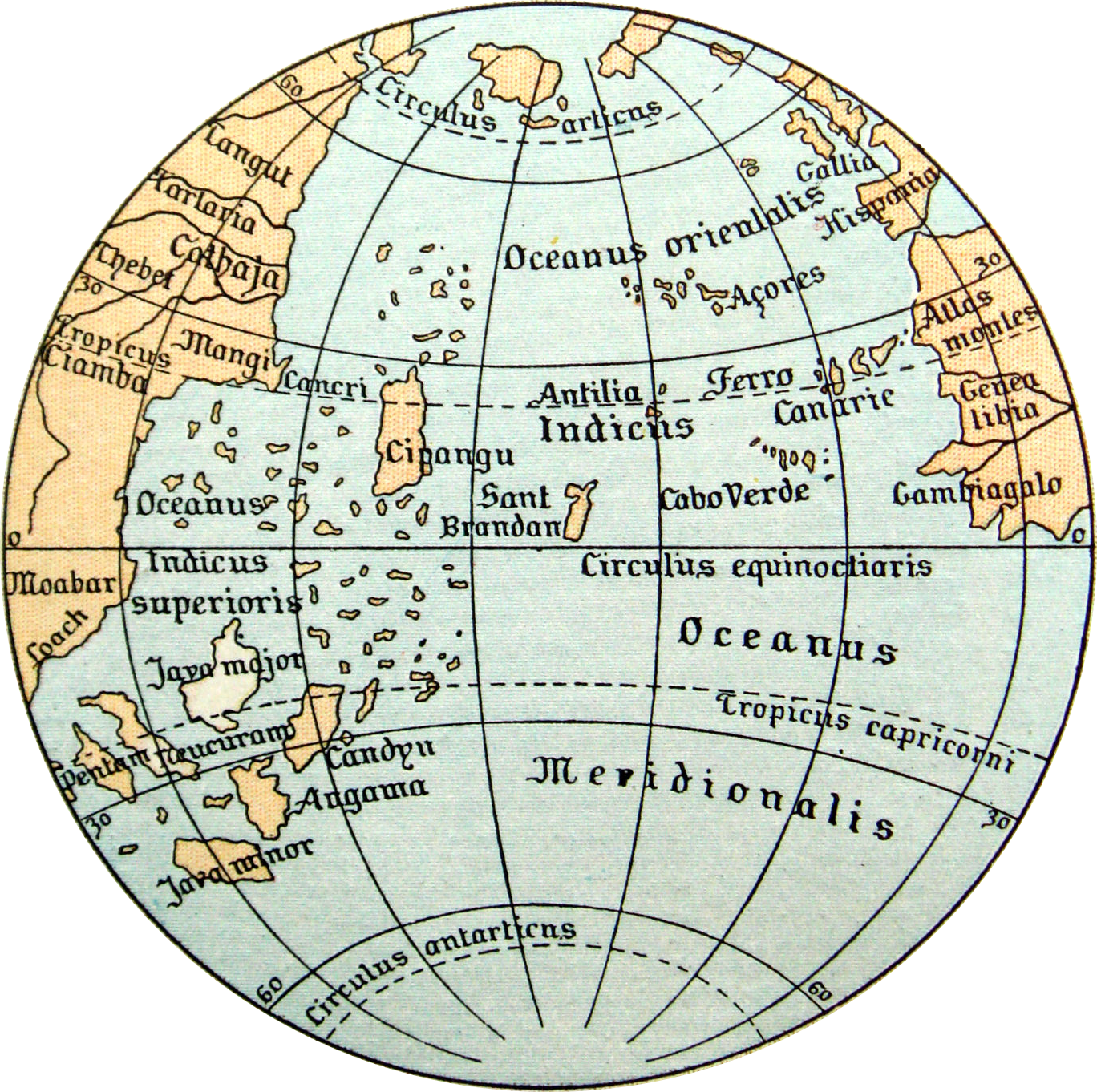
Detail of the Atlantic Ocean envisioned by Martin Behaim

After Behaim returned to Nuremberg in 1490, leading members of the city council financed the construction of a terrestrial globe. Under the direction of Behaim, a team of artisans and craftsmen constructed what has become the oldest extant globe. Georg Glockendon was the artist who created the actual map drawings following Behaim's specifications.

The globe is about 21 inches (51 cm) in diameter and was fashioned from a type of papier-mache and coated with gypsum. The ball was supported on a wooden tripod and secured by a pair of iron hoops. Glockendon's map drawings were painted onto parchment strips and pasted into position around the sphere. The globe contains more than 2,000 place names, 100 pictorial illustrations (plus 48 banners and 15 coats of arms), and more than 50 long legends. Many of the notations deal with fabulous monsters of foreign countries and their inhabitants, plants and animals. Many notes also deal with trade, explorations, and famous travelers like Marco Polo.

The world map depicted on the Behaim globe is based primarily on the geography of the second-century geographer Ptolemy. It also combines geographical information from other sources, including Marco Polo, John Mandeville, and Portuguese explorer Diogo Gomes. It is notable for lacking more current Portuguese geographic data which should have been available to Behaim and it contains numerous errors that did not reflect contemporary geographical understanding.

The completed globe, which came to be called Erdapfel (earth apple) by the townspeople, was originally housed in Nuremberg's city hall. In the 17th century the Behaim family took possession of the globe. It was inexpertly restored in 1823 and again in 1847, resulting in the corruption of many place-names and labels. The German National Museum in Nuremberg later took possession of the globe, which is commonly known as the Nuremberg Terrestrial Globe.

The antiquity of this globe and the year of its execution, on the eve of the discovery of the Americas, makes it not just the oldest globe but also represents an encyclopedia of Europe's knowledge of the known world in 1492.

Comparison of coastal outlines on maps of Juan de la Cosa and Martin Behaim with the true coastline

== See also ==
- German inventors and discoverers

== Bibliography ==
- Beazley, Charles Raymond (1911). "Behaim, Martin" . In Chisholm, Hugh (ed.). Encyclopædia Britannica. Vol. 3 (11th ed.). Cambridge University Press. pp. 653–654.
- Diffie, Bailey W.; Winius, George D. (1977). Foundations of the Portuguese Empire 1415-1580. University of Minnesota Press.
- Görz, Guenther (2007). "Behaim, Martin". The Biographical Encyclopedia of Astronomers. New York: Springer. p. 108. ISBN 9780387304007.
- Ravenstein, Ernst G. (1908). Martin Behaim, His Life and His Globe. George Philip & Son, Ltd.
- "Behaim, Martin (1459–1507)". Encyclopedia of World Biography. Detroit: Gale. 1998.
