= Caverio map =

16th-century map drawn by Nicolay de Caveri or Caverio

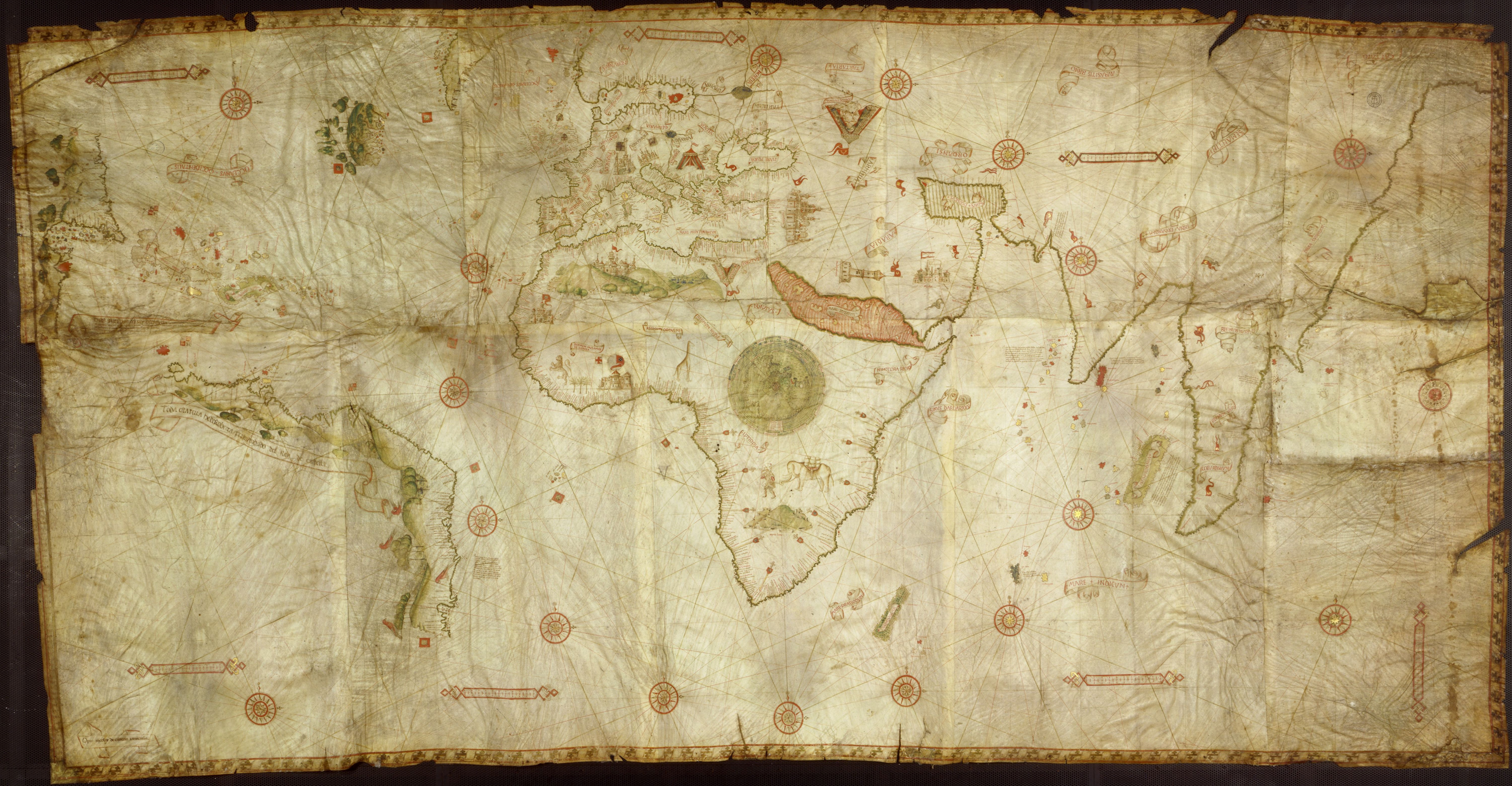
The Caverio Map

The Caverio Map (also known as Caveri Map or Canerio Map) is a map drawn by Nicolay de Caveri or Caverio, circa 1506.

== History ==
It is drawn on parchment by hand and coloured. It is composed of ten sections or panels, the whole forming a rectangle measuring 2.25 by 1.15 metres. This undated map was one of the primary sources used to make the Waldseemüller map in 1507. On the basis of this it is mostly dated to c. 1506. The map is signed with "Nicolay de Caveri Januensis". It was probably either made in Lisbon by the Genoese Caveri, or copied by him in Genoa from a Portuguese map very similar to the Cantino map, albeit not the Cantino map itself. The Cantino map was in Genoa toward the end of 1502 and some authors have assumed that Caveri could have used it as the basis of his map, at least for portions of Greenland, Newfoundland, and Brazil coast. However, other regions of the Caverio planisphere derive from other sources.

== Vera Cruz ==
The inscription off the coast of vera cruz (America/Brazil) says: “The land called Vera Cruz was found by Pedro Alvares Cabral, a gentleman of the household of the King of Portugal. He discovered it as commander of a fleet of 14 ships that that King sent to Calicut, and on the way to India, he came across this land here, which he took to be terra firma [mainland] in which there are many people, described as going about, men and women, as naked as their mothers bore them; they are lighter-skinned." The inscription was drawn from the Cantino map.

== Preservation ==
The Caverio Map is currently kept at the Bibliothèque Nationale de France in Paris.

== See also ==
- Early world maps
- Piri Reis map

== Reference Bibliography ==
- Carlos Sanz, Mapas antiguos del mundo, Madrid, 1961.
- Gaspar, Joaquim A. (2012) 'Blunders, Errors and Entanglements: Scrutining the Cantino planisphere with a Cartometric Eye', Imago Mundi, Vol. 64, Part 2: 181-200
- Gaspar, Joaquim Alves (2012). "Blunders, Errors and Entanglements: Scrutinizing the Cantino Planisphere with a Cartometric Eye". Imago Mundi. 64 (2): 181–200. doi:10.1080/03085694.2012.673762. S2CID 128787032.
