= Waldseemüller map =

1507 German world map

Universalis Cosmographia, the Waldseemüller wall map dated 1507, depicts America, Africa, Europe, Asia, and the Oceanus Orientalis Indicus separating Asia from the Americas.

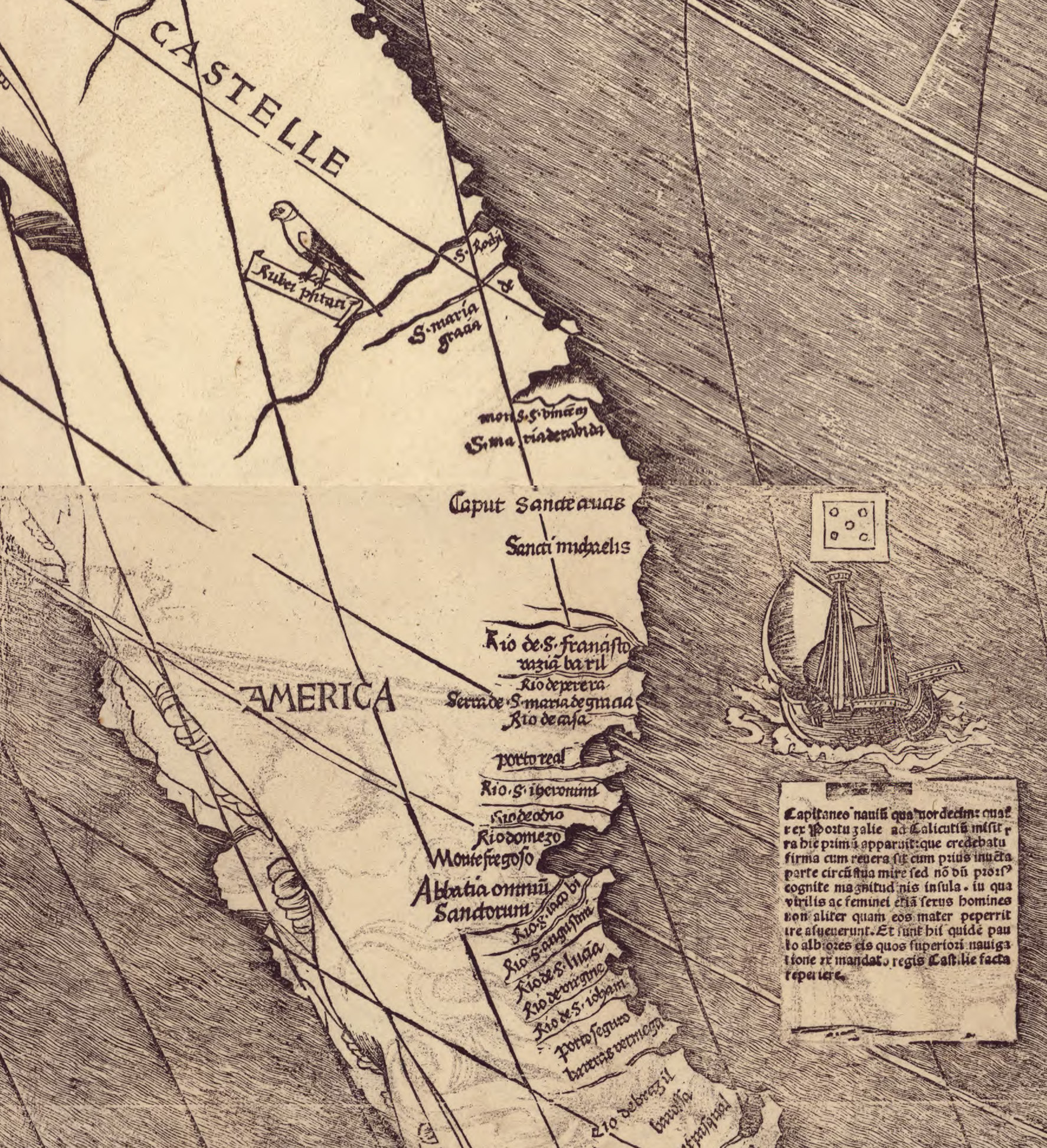
Detail of the map showing the name "America". The inscription under the ship (translated) says : "This land appeared here to the captain [ Cabral ] of the fourteen ships sent from Portugal to Calicut by the King: it was thought to be mainland [i.e. part of Asia] although, together with the previously discovered part, it is an enormous sea-girt island of yet unknown size [i.e. not part of Asia], in which both sexes, male and female, are used to going about no otherwise than as their mothers bore them. And in fact here they are somewhat lighter-skinned than those found on an earlier expedition under the command of the King of Castile."

Detail of the map showing the names "Catigara" and "Mallaqua" where "was slain St. Thomas".

The Waldseemüller map or Universalis Cosmographia ("Universal Cosmography") is a printed wall map of the world by the German cartographer Martin Waldseemüller, originally published in April 1507. It is known as the first map to use the name "America". The name America is placed on South America on the main map. As explained in Cosmographiae Introductio, the name was bestowed in honor of the Italian Amerigo Vespucci. The map also was first to depict the Americas as a distinct landmass separated from Asia by the Pacific Ocean.

The map is drafted on a modification of Ptolemy's second projection, expanded to accommodate the Americas and the high latitudes. A single copy of the map survives, presently housed at the Library of Congress in Washington, D.C.

Waldseemüller also created globe gores, printed maps designed to be cut out and pasted onto spheres to form globes of the Earth. The wall map, and his globe gores of the same date, depict the American continents in two pieces. These depictions differ from the small inset map in the top border of the wall map, which shows the two American continents joined by an isthmus.

== Wall map ==
=== Description ===
The map was meant to document and update new geographical knowledge from the discoveries of the last years of the fifteenth and the first years of the sixteenth centuries. It consists of twelve sections printed from woodcuts measuring 18 by 24.5 inches (46 cm × 62 cm). Each section is one of four horizontally and three vertically, when assembled. The map uses a modified Ptolemaic map projection with curved meridians to depict the entire surface of the Earth. In the upper-mid part of the main map there is inset another, miniature world map representing to some extent an alternative view of the world.

Longitudes, which were difficult to determine at the time, are given in terms of degrees east from the Fortunate Islands (considered by Claudius Ptolemy as the westernmost known land) which Waldseemüller locates at the Canary Islands. The longitudes of eastern Asian places are too great. Latitudes, which were easy to determine, are also quite far off. For example, "Serraleona" (Sierra Leone, true latitude about 9°N) is placed south of the equator, and the Cape of Good Hope (true latitude 35°S) is placed at 50°S.

The full title of the map is Universalis cosmographia secundum Ptholomaei traditionem et Americi Vespucii aliorumque lustrationes (The Universal Cosmography according to the Tradition of Ptolemy and the Discoveries of Amerigo Vespucci and others). One of the others was Christopher Columbus. The title signalled his intention to combine or harmonize in a unified cosmographic depiction the traditional Ptolemaic geography of Europe, Asia and Africa with the new geographical information provided by Amerigo Vespucci and his fellow discoverers of lands in the western hemisphere. He explained: "In designing the sheets of our world-map we have not followed Ptolemy in every respect, particularly as regards the new lands ... We have therefore followed, on the flat map, Ptolemy, except for the new lands and some other things, but on the solid globe, which accompanies the flat map, the description of Amerigo that is appended hereto."

Several earlier maps are believed to be sources, chiefly those based on the Geography (Ptolemy) and the Caveri planisphere and others similar to those of Henricus Martellus or Martin Behaim. The Caribbean and what appears to be Florida were depicted on two earlier charts, the Cantino map, smuggled from Portugal to Italy in 1502 showing details known in 1500, and the Caverio map, drawn c. 1503–1506 and showing the Gulf of Mexico.

While some maps after 1500 show, with ambiguity, an eastern coastline for Asia distinct from the Americas, the Waldseemüller map apparently indicates the existence of a new ocean between the trans-Atlantic regions of the Spanish discoveries and the Asia of Ptolemy and Marco Polo as exhibited on the 1492 Behaim globe. The first historical records of Europeans to set eyes on this ocean, the Pacific, are recorded as Vasco Núñez de Balboa in 1513. That is five to six years after Waldseemüller made his map. In addition, the map apparently predicts the width of South America at certain latitudes to within 70 miles. However, as pointed out by E.G. Ravenstein, this is an illusory effect of the cordiform projection used by Waldseemüller, for when the map is laid out on a more familiar equirectangular projection and compared with others of the period also set out on that same projection there is little difference between them: this is particularly evident when the comparison is made with Johannes Schöner's 1515 globe.

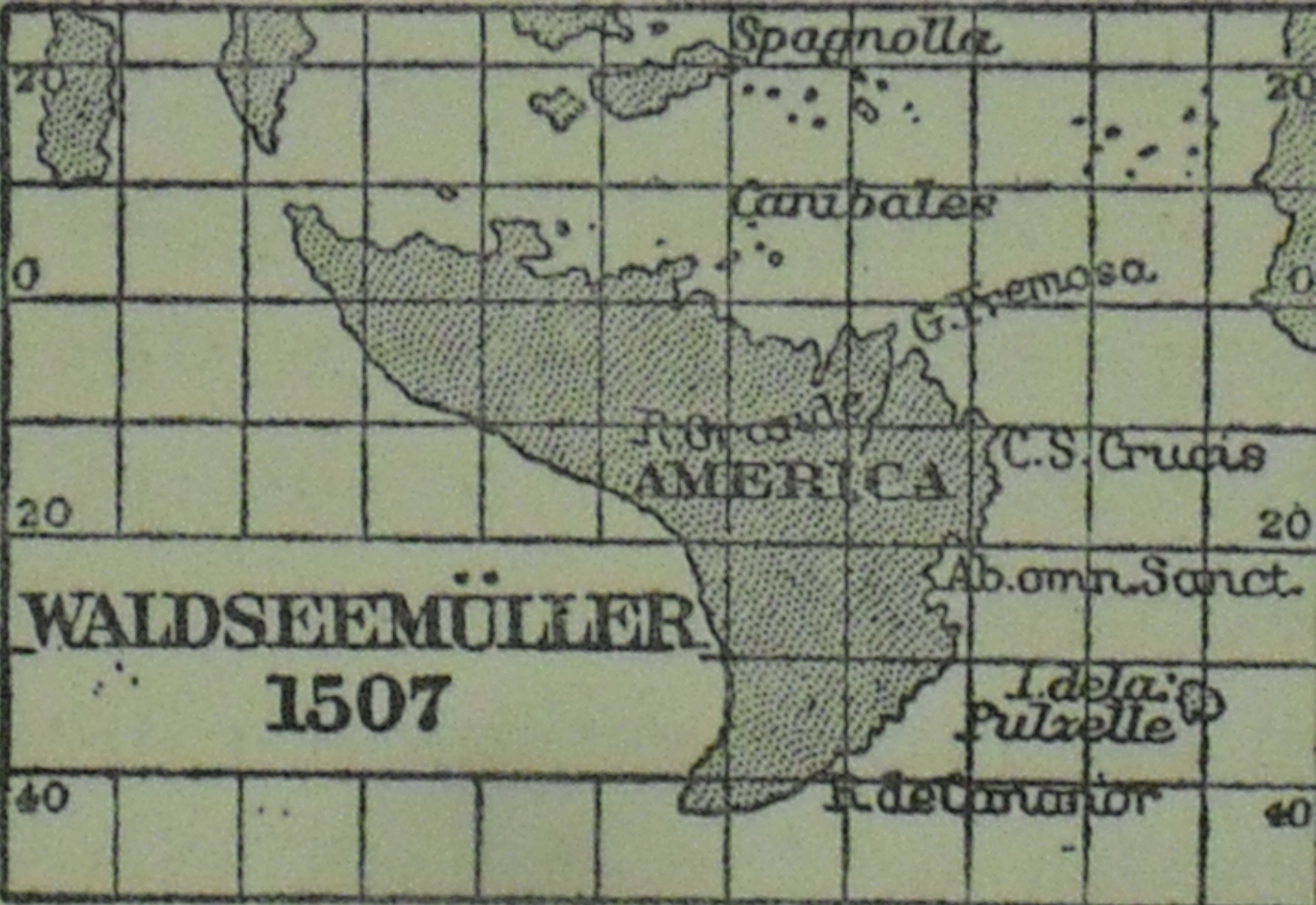
Waldseemüller's 1507 map of America re-drawn on an equirectangular projection and on the same uniform scale as that of Schöner of 1515, so as to be readily comparable.

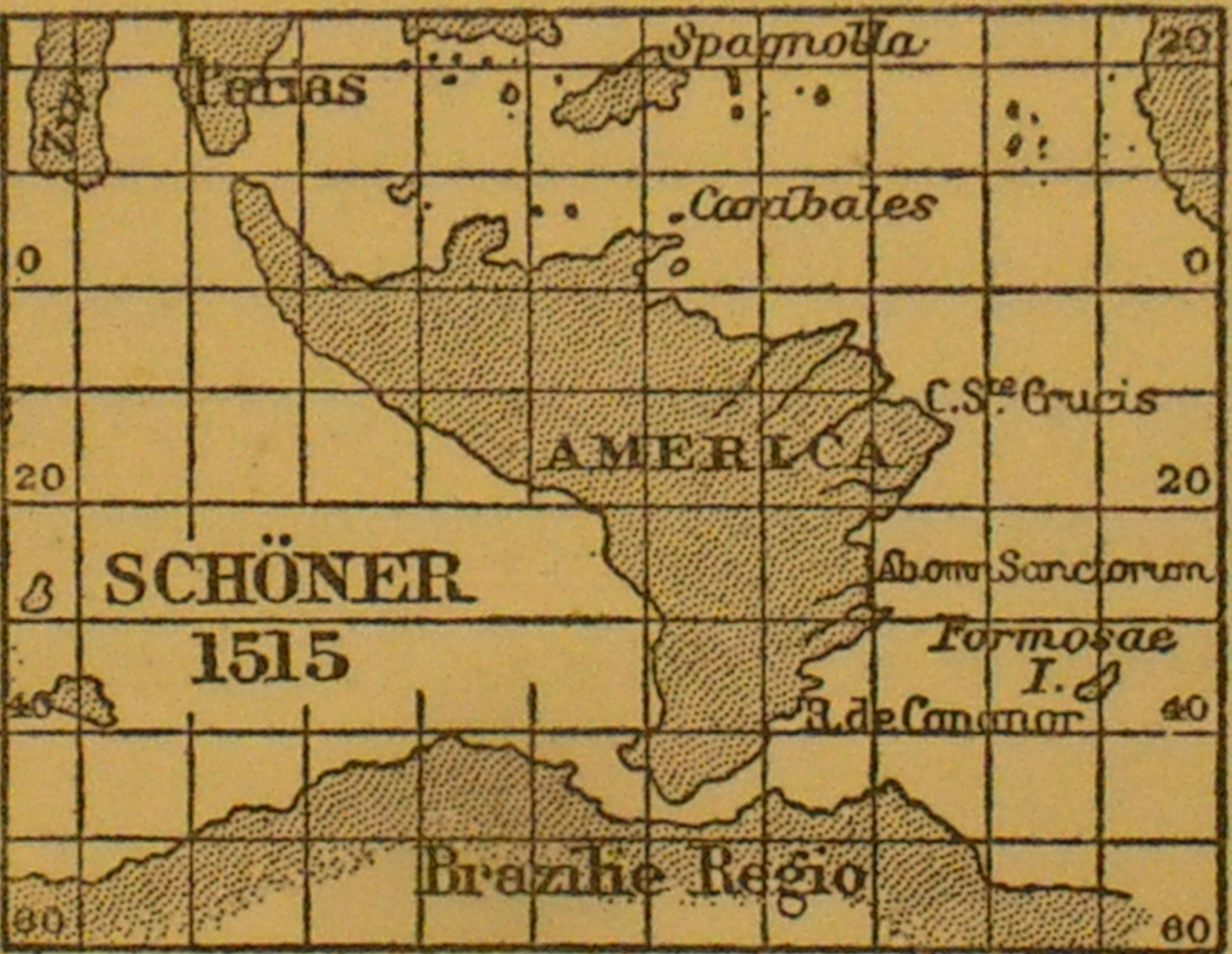
Schöner's 1515 map of America re-drawn on an equirectangular projection and on the same uniform scale as that of Waldseemüller of 1507, so as to be readily comparable.

Apparently most map-makers at the time still erroneously believed that the lands discovered by Christopher Columbus, Vespucci, and others formed part of the Indies of Asia. Amerigo Vespucci said: "After we sailed ca. 400 leagues along the coast without interruption, we concluded that this is mainland, by which I mean that it forms the easternmost point of Asia and the first tip of Asia reached when sailing westbound". On his 1506 world map, Giovanni Contarini called the land later called America by Waldseemüller the Antipodes.

Waldseemüller drew upon the 1506 world map of Nicolay de Caveri, where an inscription off the coast of vera cruz (America/Brazil) says: "The land called Vera Cruz was found by Pedro Álvares Cabral, a gentleman of the household of the King of Portugal. He discovered it as commander of a fleet of 14 ships that that King sent to Calicut, and on the way to India, he came across this land here, which he took to be terra firma [mainland] in which there are many people, described as going about, men and women, as naked as their mothers bore them; they are lighter-skinned." This came from the account of the discovery by Pedro Álvares Cabral of the Nova tellus psitacorum (new land of Parrots) during his voyage to India of 1500–1501, as reported by Giovanni Matteo da Camerino, "il Cretico", secretary of the Venetian Ambassador to Spain and Portugal, published in the Paesi Novamente Retrovati of Fracanzano da Montalboddo, where the relevant passage read: "They were borne by a west wind beyond the Cape of Good Hope, and discovered a new land, which they called that of Parrots, for there they found birds of this kind of incredible size... They judged that this was mainland because they ran along the coast more than two thousand miles but did not find the end of it". Caverio's inscription was copied by Waldseemüller and placed in the same location on his map, with the significant difference that, although Cabral and his companions believed that they had reached "the mainland", i.e. part of Asia, Waldseemüller, for unexplained reasons, asserted in the inscription on his map concerning America that it was "an enormous sea-girt island of yet unknown size", i.e. not part of Asia.

Some believe that it was impossible for Waldseemüller to know about the Pacific, which is apparently depicted on his map. The historian Peter Whitfield has theorized that Waldseemüller incorporated the ocean into his map because Vespucci's accounts of the Americas, with their savage peoples, could not be reconciled with contemporary knowledge of India, China, and the islands of the Indies. Thus, in the view of Whitfield, Waldseemüller reasoned that the newly discovered lands could not be part of Asia, but must be separate from it, a leap of intuition that was later proven uncannily accurate. An alternative explanation is that of George E. Nunn (see below). Chet Van Duzer has said that the explanation for the depiction of the Ocean to the west of America is that Marco Polo had stated that Zipangu (Japan) was an island, so that there had to be sea between it and America, which Waldseemüller had concluded was also an island.

Mundus Novus, a book attributed to Vespucci (who had himself explored the extensive eastern coast of South America), was widely published throughout Europe after 1504, including a version by Waldseemüller's group in 1507 under the title, Quatuor Americi Vespucii Navigationes. It expressed the belief of Vespucci and his companions that: "We knew that land to be not an island but continent, both from its long extending coasts which do not enclose it and from the infinite number of inhabitants which it contains". "Continent" meant, at that time, one of the three known continents, Europe, Africa and Asia, that adjoined each other (from Latin "continens"="touching") surrounded by the Ocean, which was divided by Africa into the Western, or Atlantic and Eastern, or Indian Oceans which contained the Earth's large and small islands. Vespucci's belief, therefore, was that the land was part of the continent of Asia.

It has been theorized that "continent" in the Mundus Novus meant the same as its modern meaning, that is, one of the Earth's main continuous land-masses, and that therefore it had first introduced to Europeans the idea that this was a new continent and not Asia, and that this led to Waldseemüller's separating the Americas from Asia, depicting the Pacific Ocean, and the use of the first name of Vespucci on his map.

An explanatory text, the Cosmographiae Introductio, widely believed to have been written by Waldseemüller's colleague Matthias Ringmann, accompanied the map. It was said in Chapter IX of that text that the Earth was now known to be divided into four parts, of which Europe, Asia and Africa, being contiguous with each other, were one continent, while the fourth part, America, was "an island, inasmuch as it is found to be surrounded on all sides by the seas". This differed from the belief expressed by Vespucci in Quatuor Americi Vespucii Navigationes, published in the same book as an appendix, that the land he found was part of the continent of Asia: "After nineteen days we reached new land, which we took to be the mainland". The two contradictory views were published in the same book without explanation or comment.

The inscription on the top left corner of the map proclaims that the discovery of America by Columbus and Vespucci fulfilled a prophecy of the Roman poet, Virgil, made in the Aeneid (VI. 795–797), of a land to be found in the southern hemisphere, to the south of the Tropic of Capricorn:

Many have thought to be an invention what the famous Poet said, that "a land lies beyond the stars, beyond the paths of the year and the sun, where Atlas the heaven-bearer turns on his shoulder the axis of the world set with blazing stars"; but now, at last, it proves clearly to have been true. It is, in fact, the land discovered by the King of Castile's captain, Columbus, and by Americus Vesputius, men of great and excellent talent, of which the greater part lies under the path of the year and sun, and between the tropics but extending nonetheless to about nineteen degrees beyond Capricorn toward the Antarctic pole beyond the paths of the year and the sun. Wherein, indeed, a greater amount of gold is to be found than of any other metal.

The "path" referred to is the ecliptic, which marks the sun's yearly movement along the constellations of the zodiac, so that to go beyond it meant crossing the southernmost extent of the ecliptic, the Tropic of Capricorn. 19° beyond Capricorn is latitude 42° South, the southernmost extent of America shown on Waldseemüller's map. The map legend shows how Waldseemüller strove to reconcile the new geographic information with the knowledge inherited from antiquity.

The southernmost feature named on the coast of America on the Waldseemüller map is Rio decananorum, the "River of the Cananoreans". This was taken from Vespucci, who in 1501 during his voyage along this coast reached the port which he called Cananor (now Cananéia). Cananor was the port of Kannur in southern India, the farthest port reached in India during the 1500–1501 voyage of the Portuguese Pedro Álvares Cabral, the discoverer of Brazil, two of whose ships Vespucci encountered as they returned from India. This may be an indication Waldseemüller thought that the "River of the Cananoreans" could have actually been in the territory of Cananor in India and that America was, therefore, part of India.

The name for the northern land mass, Parias, is derived from a passage in the Four Voyages of Amerigo Vespucci, in which, after several stops, the expedition arrives at a region that was "situated in the torrid zone directly under the parallel which describes the Tropic of Cancer. And this province is called by them [the inhabitants] Parias." Parias was described by Waldseemüller's follower, Johannes Schöner as: "The island of Parias, which is not a part or portion of the foregoing [America] but a large, special part of the fourth part of the world", indicating uncertainty as to its situation.

PARIAS and AMERICA, corresponding to North and South America, are separated by a strait in the region of the present Panama on the main map but on the miniature map inset into the upper-mid part of the main map the isthmus joining the two is unbroken, apparently demonstrating Waldseemüller's willingness to represent alternative solutions to a question yet unanswered.

The map shows the cities of Catigara (near longitude 180° and latitude 10°S) and Mallaqua (Malacca, near longitude 170° and latitude 20°S) on the western coast of the great peninsula that projects from the southeastern part of Asia, or INDIA MERIDIONALIS (Southern India) as Waldseemüller called it. This peninsula forms the eastern side of the SINUS MAGNUS ("Great Gulf"), the Gulf of Thailand. Amerigo Vespucci, writing of his 1499 voyage, said he had hoped to sail westward from Spain across the Western Ocean (the Atlantic) around the Cape of Cattigara mentioned by Ptolemy into the Sinus Magnus. Ptolemy understood Cattigara, or Kattigara, to be the most eastern port reached by shipping trading from the Graeco-Roman world to the lands of the Far East. Vespucci failed to find the Cape of Cattigara on his 1499 voyage: he sailed along the coast of Venezuela but not far enough to resolve the question of whether there was a sea passage beyond leading to Ptolemy's Sinus Magnus. The object of his voyage of 1503–1504 was to reach the fabulous spice emporium of "Melaccha in India" (that is, Malacca, or Melaka, on the Malay Peninsula). He had learned of Malacca from one Guaspare (or Gaspard), a pilot with Pedro Álvares Cabral's fleet on its voyage to India in 1500–1501, whom Vespucci had encountered in the Atlantic on his return from India in May 1501. Christopher Columbus, in his fourth and last voyage of 1502–1503, planned to follow the coast of Champa southward around the Cape of Cattigara and sail through the strait separating Cattigara from the New World, into the Sinus Magnus to Malacca. This was the route he understood Marco Polo to have gone from China to India in 1292 (although Malacca had not yet been founded in Polo's time). Columbus anticipated that he would meet up with the expedition sent at the same time from Portugal to Malacca around the Cape of Good Hope under Vasco da Gama, and carried letters of credence from the Spanish monarchs to present to da Gama. The map therefore shows the two cities that were the initial destinations of Amerigo Vespucci and Christopher Columbus in their voyages that led to the unexpected discovery of a New World.

Just to the south of Mallaqua (Malacca) is the inscription: hic occisus est S. thomas (Here St. Thomas was killed), referring to the legend that Saint Thomas the Apostle went to India in AD 52 and was killed there in AD 72. Waldseemüller had confused Malacca (Melaka) with Mylapore in India. The contemporary understanding of the nature of Columbus' discoveries is demonstrated in the letter written to him by the Aragonese cosmographer and Royal counsellor, Jaume Ferrer, dated 5 August 1495, saying: "Divine and infallible Providence sent the great Thomas from the Occident into the Orient in order to declare in India our Holy and Catholic Law; and you, Sir, it has sent to this opposite part of the Orient by way of the Ponient [West] so that by the Divine Will you might arrive in the Orient, and in the farthest parts of India Superior in order that the descendants might hear that which their ancestors neglected concerning the teaching of Thomas ... and very soon you will be by the Divine Grace in the Sinus Magnus, near which the glorious Thomas left his sacred body".

An inscription on the bottom right corner of the map explains that the map depicts the newly discovered parts of the world, added to those known from classical times:

Although many of the ancients were most assiduous in describing the world, yet not a little remained unknown to them, such as, in the west, America, called by that name after its discoverer, which must be considered the Fourth part of the World. So, also, in the south, the African Part that begins at nearly seven degrees this side of Capricorn and extends very extensively southward beyond the Torrid Zone and Tropic of Capricorn. As also in the east, where the Region of Cathay and some portion of India Meridional are situated beyond longitude hundred and eighty degrees. We have added all these to what we formerly knew, so that lovers of these kinds of things may behold whatever of it at this day is opened to our eyes and approve our work. But one thing we ask, that those who are untaught in and ignorant of cosmography do not at once condemn before they have learned what will no doubt be dearer to them when later they understand it.

=== History ===
At the time this wall map was drawn, Waldseemüller was working as part of the group of scholars of the Vosgean Gymnasium at Saint-Dié-des-Vosges in Lorraine, which in that time belonged to the Holy Roman Empire. The maps were accompanied by the book Cosmographiae Introductio produced by the Vosgean Gymnasium.

Of the one thousand copies that were printed, only one complete copy of the original is known to exist today. It is, in fact, a reprint in the form of a printer's proof from after 1516 instead of 1507, date of the first edition, of which there is no extant example. It was owned by Johannes Schöner (1477–1547), a Nuremberg astronomer, geographer, and cartographer. Its existence was unknown for a long time until its rediscovery in 1901 in the library of Prince Johannes zu Waldburg-Wolfegg in Schloss Wolfegg in Württemberg, Germany by the Jesuit historian and cartographer Joseph Fischer. It remained there until 2001 when the United States Library of Congress purchased it from Waldburg-Wolfegg-Waldsee for ten million dollars.

Chancellor Angela Merkel of the Federal Republic of Germany symbolically turned over the Waldseemüller map on April 30, 2007, within the context of a formal ceremony at the Library of Congress, in Washington, DC. In her remarks, the chancellor stressed that the US contributions to the development of Germany in the postwar period tipped the scales in the decision to turn over the Waldseemüller map to the Library of Congress as a sign of transatlantic affinity and as an indication of the numerous German roots to the United States. Today another facsimile of the map is exhibited for the public by the House of Waldburg in their museum on Waldburg Castle in Upper Swabia.

Since 2007, to the celebration of the 500 year jubilee of the first edition, the original map has been permanently displayed in the Library of Congress, within a specially designed microclimate case. An argon atmosphere fills the case to give an anoxic environment. Prior to display, the entire map was the subject of a scientific analysis project using hyperspectral imaging with an advanced LED camera and illumination system to address preservation storage and display issues.

The Waldseemüller map was inscribed on UNESCO's Memory of the World International Register in 2005.

=== Nunn's analysis ===
The geographers of Italy and Germany, like Martin Waldseemüller and his colleagues, were exponents of a theoretical geography, or cosmography. This means they appealed to theory where their knowledge of the American and Asiatic geography was lacking. That practice differed from the official Portuguese and Spanish cartographers, who omitted from their maps all unexplored coastlines.

The second century Alexandrian geographer Claudius Ptolemy had believed that the known world extended over 180 degrees of longitude from the prime meridian of the Fortunate Isles (possibly the Canary Islands) to the city of Cattigara in southeastern Asia. (In fact, the difference in longitude between the Canaries, at 16°W, and Cattigara, at 105°E, is just 121°.) He had also thought that the Indian Ocean was completely surrounded by land. Marco Polo demonstrated that an ocean lay east of Asia and was connected with the Indian Ocean. Hence, on the globe made by Martin Behaim in 1492, which combined the geography of Ptolemy with that of Marco Polo, the Indian Ocean was shown as merging with the Western Ocean to the east. Ptolemy's lands to the east of the Indian Ocean, however, were retained in the form of a great promontory projecting far south from the southeastern corner of Asia—the peninsula of Upper India (India Superior) upon which the city of Cattigara was situated.

Another result of Marco Polo's travels was also shown on Behaim's globe—the addition of 60 degrees to the longitude of Asia. Columbus had not actually seen Behaim's globe in 1492 (which apparently owed much to the ideas of Paolo dal Pozzo Toscanelli); but the globe, except for one important point, reflects the geographical theory on which he apparently based his plan for his first voyage. The exception is that Columbus shortened the length of the degree, thus reducing the distance from the Canaries to Zipangu (Japan), to about 62 degrees or only 775 leagues. Consequently, it seemed to Columbus a relatively simple matter to reach Asia by sailing west.

In the early 16th century, two theories prevailed with regard to America (the present South America). According to one theory, that continent was identified with the southeastern promontory of Asia that figures on Behaim's globe, India Superior or the Cape of Cattigara. The other view was that America (South America) was a huge island wholly unconnected with Asia.

Balboa called the Pacific the Mar del Sur and referred to it as "la otra mar", the other sea, by contrast with the Atlantic, evidently with Behaim's concept of only two oceans in mind. The Mar del Sur, the South Sea, was the part of the Indian Ocean to the south of Asia: the Indian Ocean was the Oceanus Orientalis, the Eastern Ocean, as opposed to the Atlantic or Western Ocean, the Oceanus Occidentalis in Behaim's two ocean world.

According to George E. Nunn, the key to Waldseemüller's apparent new ocean is found on the three sketch maps made by Bartolomé Colon (that is, Bartholomew Columbus, Christopher's brother) and Alessandro Zorzi in 1504 to demonstrate the geographical concepts of Christopher Columbus. One of the Columbus/Zorzi sketch maps bears an inscription saying that: "According to Marinus of Tyre and Columbus, from Cape St. Vincent to Cattigara is 225 degrees, which is 15 hours; according to Ptolemy as far as Cattigara 180 degrees, which is 12 hours". This shows that Christopher Columbus overestimated the distance eastward between Portugal and Cattigara as being 225 degrees instead of Ptolemy's estimate of 180 degrees, permitting him to believe the distance westward was only 135 degrees and therefore that the land he found was the East Indies. As noted by Nunn, in accordance with this calculation, the Colon/Zorzi maps employ the longitude estimate of Claudius Ptolemy from Cape St. Vincent eastward to Cattigara, but the longitude calculation of Marinus and Columbus is employed for the space between Cape St. Vincent westward to Cattigara.

Nunn pointed out that Martin Waldseemüller devised a scheme that showed both the Columbus and the Ptolemy-Behaim concept on the same map. As Waldseemüller himself said: "We have followed Ptolemy on the flat map, except for the new lands". On the right hand side of the Waldseemüller 1507 map is shown the Ptolemy-Behaim concept with the Ptolemy longitudes: this shows the huge peninsula of India Superior extending to the south of the Tropic of Capricorn. On the left side of the Waldseemüller map the discoveries of Columbus, Vespucci and others are represented as a long strip of land extending from about latitude 50 degree North to latitude 40 degrees South. The western coasts of these trans-Atlantic lands discovered under the Spanish crown are simply described by Waldseemüller as Terra Incognita (Unknown Land) or Terra Ulterius Incognita (Unknown Land Further beyond), with a conjectural sea to the west, making these lands apparently a distinct continent. America's (that is, South America's) status as a separate island or a part of Asia, specifically, the peninsula of India Superior upon which Cattigara was situated, is left unresolved. As the question of which of the two alternative concepts was correct had not been resolved at the time, both were represented on the same map. Both extremities of the map represent the eastern extremity of Asia, according to the two alternative theories. As Nunn said, "This was a very plausible way of presenting a problem at the time insoluble."

As noted by Nunn, the distance between the meridians on the map is different going eastward and westward from the prime meridian which passes through the Fortunate Isles (Canary Islands). This has the effect of representing the eastern coast of Asia twice: once in accordance with Ptolemy's longitudes to show it as Martin Behaim had done on his 1492 globe; and again in accordance with Columbus' calculation of longitudes to show his and the other Spanish navigators' discoveries across the Western Ocean, which Columbus and his followers considered to be part of India Superior.

On his 1516 world map, the Carta Marina, Waldseemüller identified the land he had called Parias on his 1507 map as Terra de Cuba and said it was part of Asia (Asie partis); that is, he explicitly identified the land discovered by Columbus as the eastern part of Asia.

== Globe gores ==
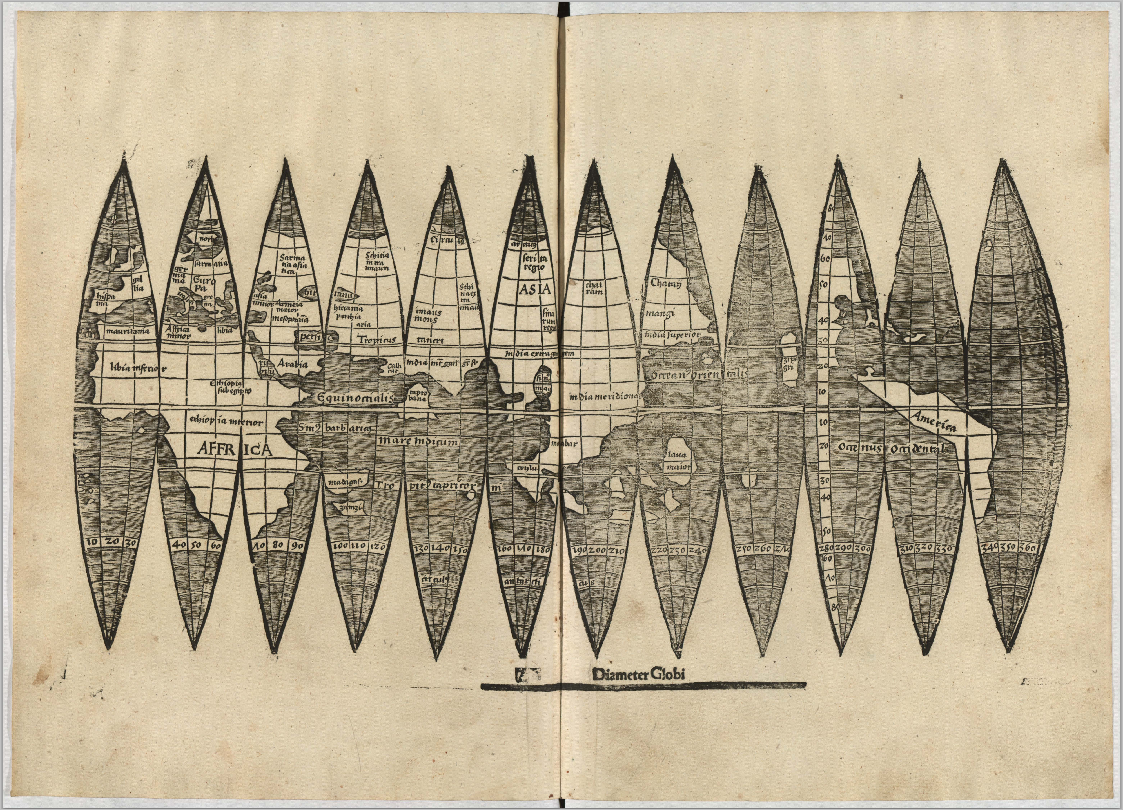
Globe gore version found at LMU Munich in 2012

Besides Universalis Cosmographia, Waldseemüller published a set of gores for constructing globes. The gores, also containing the inscription America, are believed to have been printed in the same year as the large wall map, since Waldseemüller mentions them in the introduction to his Cosmographiæ Introductio. The Cosmographiae Introductio explained:

In designing the sheets of our world-map we have not followed Ptolemy in every respect, particularly as regards the new lands ... We have therefore followed, on the plane map, Ptolemy, except for the new lands and some other things, but on the solid globe, which accompanies the plane map, the description of Amerigo that is appended hereto.

On the globe gores, the sea to the west of the notional American west coast is named the Oceanus Occidentalis, that is, the Western or Atlantic Ocean. Where it merges with the Oceanus Orientalis (the Eastern, or Pacific Ocean) is hidden by the latitude staff. This appears to indicate uncertainty as to the location of America, whether it was an island continent in the Atlantic (Western Ocean) or in fact the great peninsula of India Superior shown on earlier maps, such as the 1489 map of the world by Martellus or the 1492 globe of Behaim.

Only four authentic copies of the globe gore maps are extant. The first to be rediscovered was found in 1871 and is now in the James Ford Bell Library of the University of Minnesota. Another copy was found inside a Ptolemy atlas and had been in the Bavarian State Library in Munich since 1990. In February 2018, the library more thoroughly reviewed the map's authenticity, and discovered that it was a forgery printed in the first half of the 20th century. A third copy was discovered in 1992 bound into an edition of Aristotle in the Stadtbücherei Offenburg, a public library in Germany. A fourth copy came to light in 2003 when its European owner read a newspaper article about the Waldseemüller map. A fifth copy was found in 2018 and prepared for auction by Christie's; it was determined to be a forgery, identical to the forged version owned by the Bavarian State Library.

In July 2012, a statement was released by LMU Munich, that another copy of the globe gore map had been found in the LMU Library's collection which is slightly different from the other copies, perhaps because of a later date of printing. LMU Library has made an electronic version of their copy of the map available online.

== See also ==
- Ancient world maps
- Caverio map, made in 1505.
- History of cartography
- Johannes Schöner globe, made in 1520.
- List of most expensive books and manuscripts
- Mappa mundi
- Naming of the Americas
- Piri Reis map
- Theatrum Orbis Terrarum, considered to be the first true modern atlas.
- World map
