= Second Piri Reis map (1528) =

1528 Ottoman nautical chart

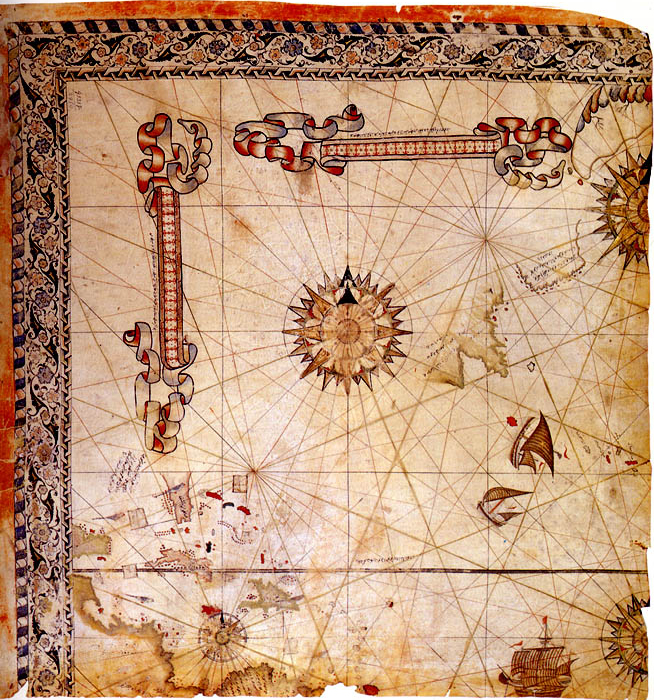
Surviving fragment of the second world map of Piri Reis (1528)

In 1528, Piri Reis completed a second world map. It is the less famous of the two, though much more accurate. The 1528 map incorporates many additional European discoveries including Greenland, Newfoundland, Florida, and the Yucatán. Marking a move away from the speculative geometry of the first map, unexplored regions are left blank. Currently, it is housed at the Topkapı Palace Museum in Istanbul, Turkey.

== Background ==
Piri Reis was the nephew of Ottoman corsair Kemal Reis, and as a teenager fought alongside his uncle against Spain and Venice. He compiled notes throughout his travels, and after his uncle's death, returned to his hometown of Gelibolu. He created a world map in 1513 combining contemporary Portuguese and Spanish sources with Arabic maps and classical geography. Soon after the map's completion, he was brought back into the Ottoman Navy and gifted it to Sultan Selim I following Ottoman victory over the Mamluks in Egypt. How the 1513 world map was used, if at all, is unknown as it vanished from history until its rediscovery centuries later.

The 1513 world map is well-known for containing material from an otherwise-lost map of Christopher Columbus that Piri Reis confiscated from a Spaniard that his uncle took on board as a galley slave near Valencia. Though Columbus mentions the charts and maps that he creates for the Spanish Crown, none have survived. Both versions of Piri Reis' atlas, the Kitab-ı Bahriye, are highly regarded as cartographic works, as artistic works, and as snapshots into the Mediterranean at a time of great geopolitical change.

The 1528 map does not rely on the early works of Columbus, which makes it less historically significant, but frees it from many cartographic errors. Most notably, Cuba is now correctly depicted as an island in the Caribbean. Historian Svat Soucek has characterized Piri Reis' career as a point where the Ottoman state diverged from the European age of exploration, noting the irony that many major European cartographers were employed by their monarchs, , while Piri Reis was beheaded by his sultan. Commenting on the lack any surviving maps from after the 1528 map that Piri Reis "seeing no reward or encouragement forthcoming, finally gave up on this line of career" devoting his efforts more fully to piracy and naval combat.

== Description ==
Only a fragment of the map—the northwest corner—remains. The parchment fragment is approximately 70 centimeters (28 in) square. As with the 1513 map, the 1528 map has calligraphic inscriptions in Ottoman-Turkish written in the Arabic alphabet. The colophon is in Arabic, likely handwritten by Piri Reis himself. According to the colophon, Piri Reis compiled the map in 1528 in Gelibolu. However, he may not have completed it until 1529.

The 1528 map was a portolan chart like his earlier works. It uses a windrose network radiating out from compass roses. The map does include one line of latitude, the Tropic of Cancer; it is slightly south of the correct position for Cuba and the Yucatán. The map uses standard portolan colors and symbols. Dots indicate shallow waters and sand banks. Crosses indicate rocks and reefs. Although such charts were typically made for use aboard ships, the map's elaborate details indicate that it—like his first world map gifted to the sultan—was created for a wealthy patron. The ships painted on the map are two caravels and a carrack. The scale bars indicate 80 km (50 mi) between the sections of the scales.

The 1528 map is more accurate than Piri Reis' earlier world map and reflects new discoveries in the Americas. Its depiction of the newly explored regions of Greenland, Newfoundland, and Florida suggests that the cartography relied on Spanish, Portuguese, and Italian maps from the 1520s. Hispaniola is correctly oriented relative to Cuba, while Cuba, labeled "Izle di Vana," is accurately depicted as an island in the Caribbean. An inscription notes that a traveler crossed Central America to reach the sea, likely Vasco Núñez de Balboa, who crossed the Isthmus of Panama in 1513.

Unlike the 1513 map, unexplored regions are left blank, marking a clear shift away from speculative cartography. Notes on the map cite recent Portuguese voyages to Labrador and Newfoundland. Only the explored southern coastline of Florida is shown, while the remainder is left ambiguous, potentially representing either an island or a peninsula. The Padrón Real, the Spanish Empire's master chart, continuously updated with information from new voyages, included this same ambiguity until 1520 and influenced Italian cartography. Florida appears as an indeterminate peninsula on four other extant manuscript maps from the period: the Turin planisphere, the Freducci map, Giovanni da Verrazzano's planisphere, and the 1527 Pseudo-da-Vinci globe gores. All likely derive from a single Spanish source charting Juan Ponce de León's 1513 voyage. According to Turkish science historian Sevim Tekeli, these changes demonstrate that Piri Reis was actively following European voyages of discovery.

== Locations ==
Beginning from the top right corner of the map and moving clockwise, the first landmass is a version of Greenland, drawn with minimal detail and illustrated with multi-colored mountains. South and west, across a gap of water, the Atlantic coast of Bakile is drawn. The name is similar to Bacalao, a term used in Portuguese cartography sometimes to refer to Newfoundland and sometimes resulting in a phantom island near Newfoundland. The form of the coast, however, is more similar to another Medieval variant of Greenland. In the medieval period, Greenland appeared a range of configurations as either islands or peninsulas in various locations.

On the other side of the bay from Bakile is Newfoundland, credited to "Portuguese infidels". This early Portuguese version of Newfoundland as a vague coast appears on several period maps. The captions for Bakile and Newfoundland both conclude with an explanation that "only what has been recorded has been drawn."

No attempt has been made to fill in the land between the far North and Florida. From the ornate border of the map, the Yucatán peninsula protrudes in, separated by the Tropic of Cancer, from Central America. The torn bottom edge of the map shows the northern coast of Venezuela, though the inscriptions are nearly illegible. The chain of islands in the Atlantic are the Azores, drawn in roughly the correct location.

Inscriptions
No.	Identification	Transliteration
I	[mile marker]	Bu mil işarettir. Haneden haneye altışar mildir. Noktadan noktaya onar milder.
II	[mile marker]	Bu mil işarettir. Haneden haneye elli mildir. Noktadan noktaya onar milder.
III	[colophon]	Bu 935 yılında, Gelibolu şehrinde merhum Gazi Kemal Reis'in erkek kardeşinin oğlu olark ün yapmış Hacı Mehmed'in oğlu hakir Piri Reis çizmiştir. İşbu çalışma kesin olarak onundur.
IV	Florida	San Juvana Bastisde
V	Cuba	Izle di Vana
VI	Hispaniola	San Juwana
VII	Tropic of Cancer	Bu çizgi, gün gayet uzadığı yere işarettir.
VIII	Central America	Vilayeti ... bundan ötesi bilinmemektedir
IX	Panama	Karadan aşırıp [aşıp] ... denizen aslı nedir diye bilmek için.
X (a)	Venezuela	Diye
X (b)	Venezuela	Sore
X (c)	Venezuela	Detonos
X (d)	Venezuela	Ponte Sogon
X (e)	Venezuela	Monte Krago
X (f)	Venezuela	San Cilormi
X (g)	Venezuela	diye Sagram
XI	Santa Maria Island	Santa Maria
XII	São Miguel	San Mikal
XIII	São Jorge	San Jorjo
XIV	Pico	Epiko
XV	Flores	Evfral
XVI	Corvo Faial	Oskorals
XVII	Newfoundland	Bu alamet başka bir kenardır. Portekiz kafiri bulmuştur. Tamamı dahi malum değildir. Bulunan yeri yazılmıştır.
XVIII	[Greenland?]	Bu Bakile ki buna Portekiz kâfiri bulmuştur, bulunduğu kadarı yazılmıştır.

== See also ==
- Piri Reis map
- Kitab-ı Bahriye
