= Piri Reis map =

1513 Ottoman nautical chart

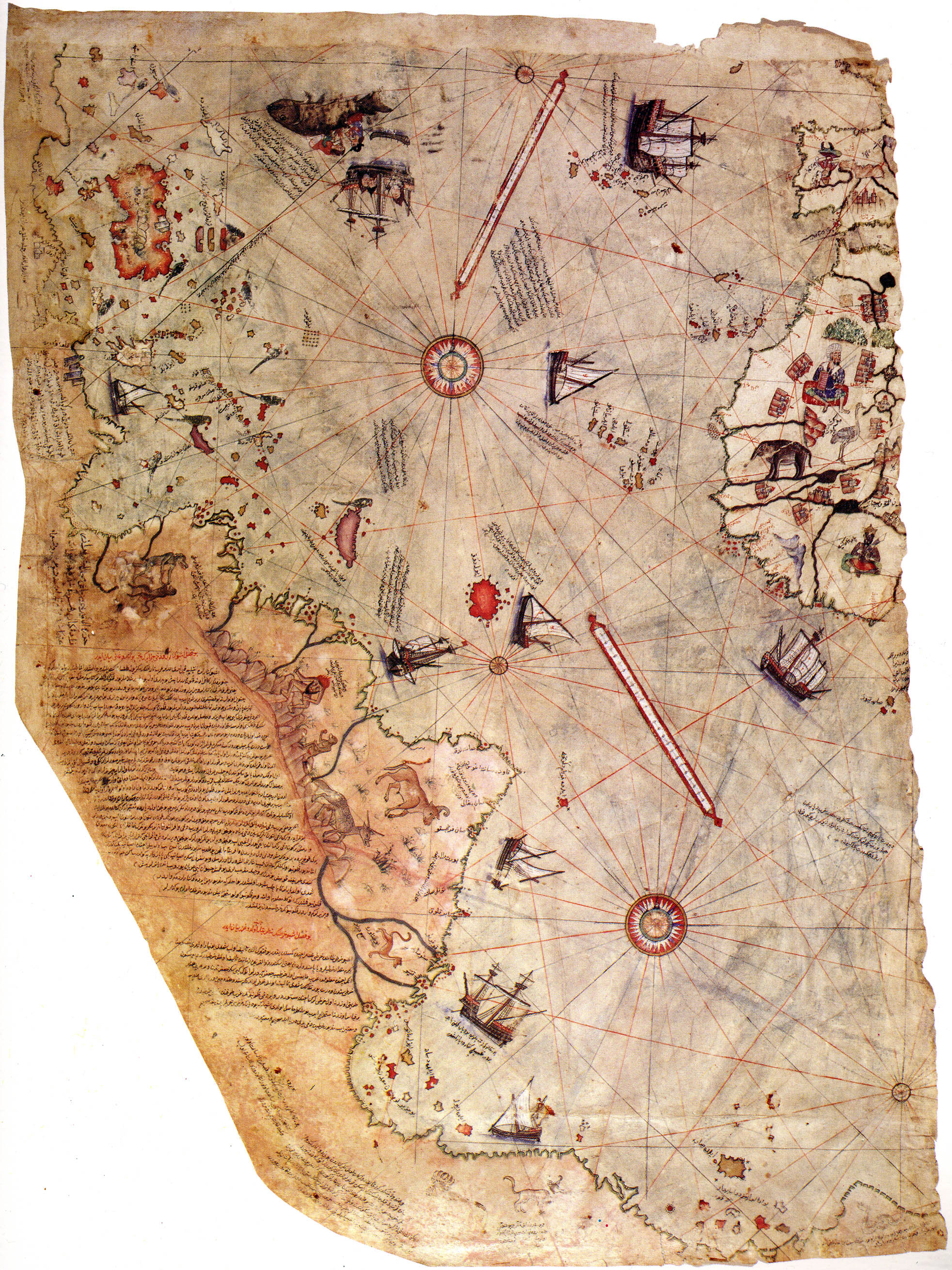
Surviving fragment of the Piri Reis map

The Piri Reis map is a world map compiled in 1513 by the Ottoman admiral and cartographer Piri Reis. Approximately one third of the map survives, housed in the Topkapı Palace in Istanbul. After the empire's 1517 conquest of Egypt, Piri Reis presented the 1513 world map to Ottoman Sultan Selim I (r. 1512–1520). It is unknown how Selim used the map, if at all, as it vanished from history until its rediscovery centuries later. When rediscovered in 1929, the remaining fragment garnered international attention as it includes a partial copy of an otherwise lost map by Christopher Columbus.

The map is a portolan chart with compass roses and a windrose network for navigation, rather than lines of longitude and latitude. It contains extensive notes primarily in Ottoman Turkish. The depiction of South America is detailed and accurate for its time. The northwestern coast combines features of Central America and Cuba into a single body of land. Scholars attribute the peculiar arrangement of the Caribbean to a now-lost map from Columbus that merged Cuba into the Asian mainland and Hispaniola with Marco Polo's description of Japan. This reflects Columbus's erroneous claim that he had found a route to Asia. The southern coast of the Atlantic Ocean is most likely a version of Terra Australis.

The map is visually distinct from European portolan charts, influenced by the Islamic miniature tradition. It was unusual in the Islamic cartographic tradition for incorporating many non-Muslim sources. Historian Karen Pinto has described the positive portrayal of legendary creatures from the edge of the known world in the Americas as breaking away from the medieval Islamic idea of an impassable "Encircling Ocean" surrounding the Old World.

There are conflicting interpretations of the map. Scholarly debate exists over the specific sources used in the map's creation and the number of source maps. Many areas on the map have not been conclusively identified with real or mythical places. Some authors have noted visual similarities to parts of the Americas not officially discovered by 1513, but there is no textual or historical evidence that the map represents land south of present-day Cananéia. A disproven 20th-century hypothesis identified the southern landmass with an ice-free Antarctic coast.

== History ==
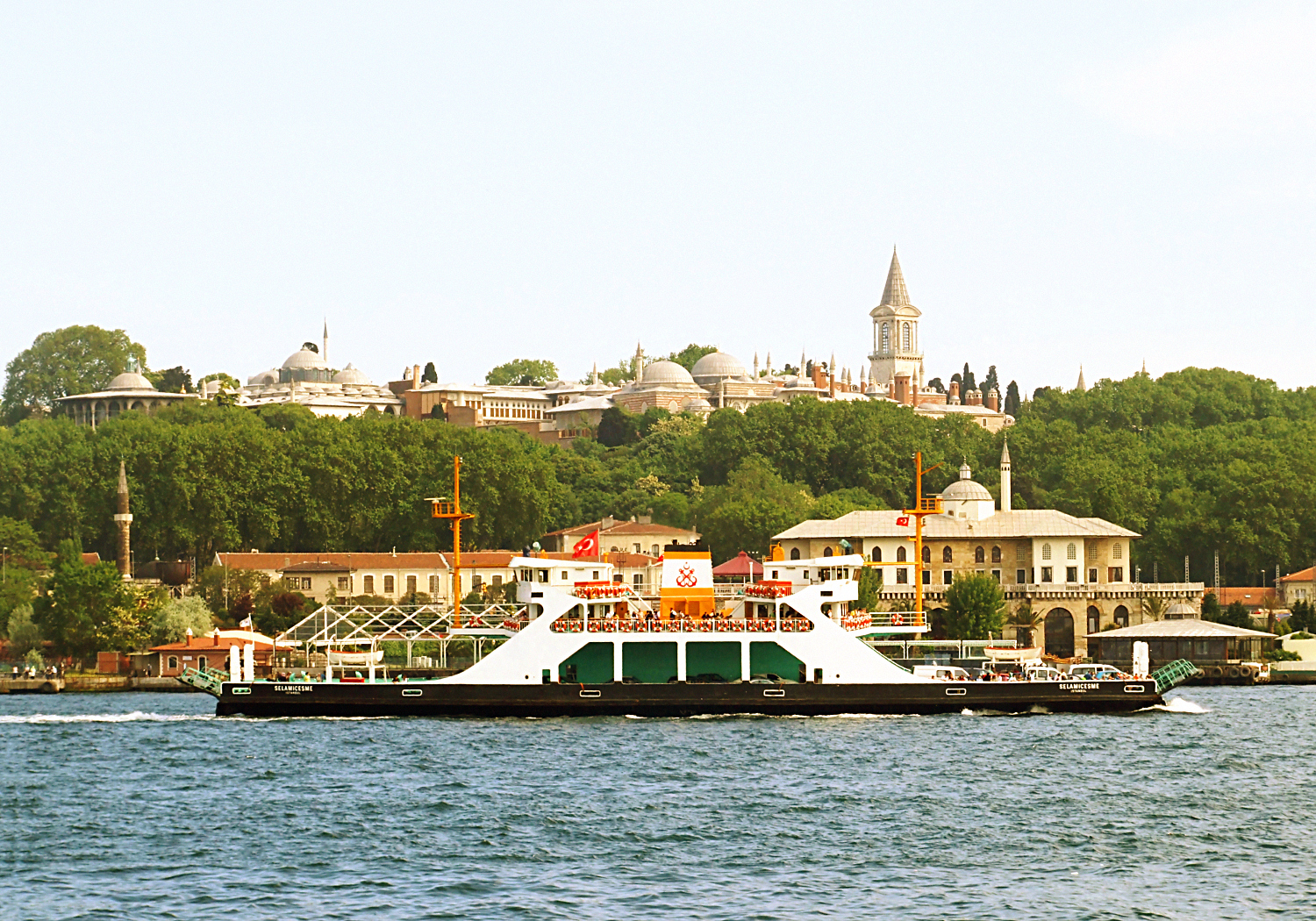
The Topkapı Palace where the map was discovered, viewed from the Bosporus

Much of Piri Reis's biography is known only from his cartographic works, including his two world maps and the Kitab-ı Bahriye (Book of the Sea) completed in 1521. He sailed with his uncle Kemal Reis as a Barbary pirate until Kemal Reis received an official position in the Ottoman Navy in 1495. In one naval battle, Piri Reis and his uncle captured a Spaniard who had participated in Columbus's voyages, and who likely possessed an early map of the Americas that Piri Reis would use as a source. (Note: The capture of a Spanish slave is described in the large caption on the left margin of the map. McIntosh suggests that this was likely a naval officer or pilot taken as a prisoner-of-war, who had been on at least Columbus's third voyage of 1498–1500 (McIntosh 2000a, pp. 72–75).) When his uncle died, Piri Reis temporarily returned to Gallipoli and began composing his first world map in 1511. The finished manuscript was dated to the month of Muharram in the Islamic year 919 AH, equivalent to 1513 AD. Piri Reis returned to the navy and played a role in the 1517 conquest of Egypt. After the Ottoman victory, Piri Reis presented the 1513 world map to Ottoman Sultan Selim I (r. 1512–1520). (Note: From the Kitab-ı Bahriye (1521), as translated by Kahle (1933): "This poor man [Piri Reis] had previously constructed a map which, in comparison with maps hitherto known, displayed many more [and] different details, [and] in which he had included even the newly published maps of the Indian and Chinese Oceans which at that time were totally unknown in the country of Rūm [the Ottoman Empire]; and he had presented it in Cairo to the Turkish Sultan Selim I, who graciously accepted it, (Kahle 1933, p. 621).") It is unknown how Selim used the map, if at all, as it vanished from history until its rediscovery centuries later.

Scholars unearthed a fragment of the map in late 1929. During the conversion of the Topkapı Palace into a museum, the Director of National Museums Dr. Halil Edhem Eldem invited German theologian Gustav Adolf Deissmann to tour its library. Deissmann persuaded the Rockefeller Foundation to fund a project to preserve ancient manuscripts from the palace library. Halil Edhem gave Deissmann unprecedented access to the library's collection of non-Islamic items. (Note: Halil Edhem unearthed undocumented manuscripts and gave Deissmann access to previously inaccessible rooms including an underground treasure-chamber and three hidden crypts—one of which was only accessible via trapdoor (Gerber 2010, pp. 198–201).) Deissmann confirmed the collection to have been the vast private library of Mehmed II (r. 1444–1481) and—based on Mehmed II's interest in geography—asked Halil Edhem to search for potentially overlooked maps. Halil Edhem found a disregarded bundle of material containing an unusual parchment map. They showed the parchment to orientalist Paul E. Kahle, who identified it as a creation of Piri Reis citing a source map from Colombus's voyages to the Americas. Kahle, and later scholars analyzing the map, found evidence for an early origin in the voyages of Columbus. The discovery of a surviving piece of an otherwise lost map of Christopher Columbus received international media attention. Turkey's first president, Mustafa Kemal Atatürk, took an interest in the map and initiated projects to publish facsimiles and conduct research.

== Description ==
Translated map (Note: Regarding map sources: Transliterations in italics are from Akçura (1935).; Translations of major inscriptions are from Akçura (1935), as cited.; Identifications of place names in green text are from McIntosh (2000a).; Original translations in [brackets] draw from Akçura's transliteration, machine translation, McIntosh (2000a), Kahle (1933), İnan & Yolaç (1954), Soucek (1996), and the following English/Turkish dictionaries: Seslisözlük, IngilizceTurkce.com and Sözlükte.)

Kept in the Topkapı Palace Museum, the map is the remaining western third of a world map drawn on gazelle-skin parchment approximately 87 cm × 63 cm. (Note: Because of its irregular shape, the dimensions have been variously reported as: 90 cm × 63 cm: (Nebenzahl 1990, p. 63).; 86 cm × 60 cm: (Kahle 1933, p. 621).; 90 cm × 65 cm: (Mollat du Jourdin, La Roncière & le R. Dethan 1984, p. 218); (Portinaro & Knirsch 1987, p. 47); (Tekeli 1985, p. 676); (Yerci 1989, p. 154).; 85 cm × 60 cm: (Deissmann 1933, p. 111).; 87 cm × 63 cm: (Van de Waal 1969, p. 82).; 86 cm × 62 cm: (Smithsonian Institution 1966, p. 104).) The surviving portion shows the Atlantic Ocean with the coasts of Europe, Africa, and South America. The map is a portolan chart with compass roses from which lines of bearing radiate. Designed for navigation by dead reckoning, portolan charts use a windrose network rather than a longitude and latitude grid. There are extensive notes within the map. Written with the Arabic alphabet, the inscriptions are in Ottoman Turkish except for the colophon. The colophon is written in Arabic using a different handwriting from the other inscriptions. It was likely handwritten by Piri Reis, rather than assigned to a calligrapher.

=== Places ===
The remaining third of the map focuses on the Atlantic and the Americas. In the top left corner, the Caribbean is arranged unlike modern or contemporary maps. The large island oriented vertically is labeled Hispaniola, and the western coast includes elements of Cuba and Central America. Inscriptions on South America and the Southern Continent cite recent Portuguese voyages. The distance between Brazil and Africa is roughly correct, and the Atlantic islands are drawn consistent with European portolan charts.

Many places on the map have been identified as phantom islands or have not been identified conclusively. İle Verde (Green Island) north of Hispaniola could refer to many islands. (Note: Greenland was known in medieval times as a land in the west. From the sixteenth-century variations of Green Land (often in addition to a correctly depicted Greenland) appear in various locations (Ramsay 1972, ch. 6). The position and shape of İle Verde on Piri Reis' map most closely matches Inagua in the Bahamas (McIntosh 2000a, p. 101).) The large island in the Atlantic, İzle de Vaka (Ox island), corresponds to no known real or fictional island. Both an Atlantic island and the mainland of the Americas are referred to as the legendary Antilia. (Note: After Tariq ibn Ziyad led a Muslim army across the Strait of Gibraltar, Christian refugees fled Visigothic Spain (Ramsay 1972, pp. 121–122). A legend arose that seven bishops sailed west to found seven cities. The seven cities were associated with the phantom island Antilia, located somewhere in the Atlantic (Morison 1971, pp. 97–99). As voyages crossed the empty ocean where Antilia had been placed on maps, the idea and name were applied to the New World, becoming the mythical Seven Cities of Gold (Ramsay 1972, pp. 121–214).)

=== Sources ===
According to the map's legend, it was based on:

- Twenty charts and Mappae Mundi
- Eight Jaferiyes (Geographia or Jughrafiya)
- An Arabic map of India
- Four newly drawn Portuguese maps of Asia
- A map by Christopher Columbus of the West Indies

There is some scholarly debate over the various sources. In the modern sense, mappae mundi refer to medieval Christian schematic maps of the world. In the fifteenth century, the term was also literally used to describe world maps, and it is possible the source maps fit in that broader definition. The Jaferiyes are seen by scholars as a corruption of the Arabic Jughrafiya, most often taken to mean the Geographia of Claudius Ptolemy. Ptolemy's book was widely printed during the sixteenth century, accompanied by maps from Nicolaus Germanus and Maximus Planudes. The Jaferiyes may also refer to the largely symbolic world maps of medieval Islamic cartography. Descended from classical scholarship, these treatises sometimes used the loanword jughrafiya in their titles. The Arabic and the four Portuguese source maps have not been conclusively identified but have been associated with several notable maps of the period. Finally, there is debate on the total number of source documents. Some scholars interpret the "20 charts and mappae mundi" in the inscriptions as including the other maps, and others interpret them to mean a total of 30 or 34.

== Analysis ==
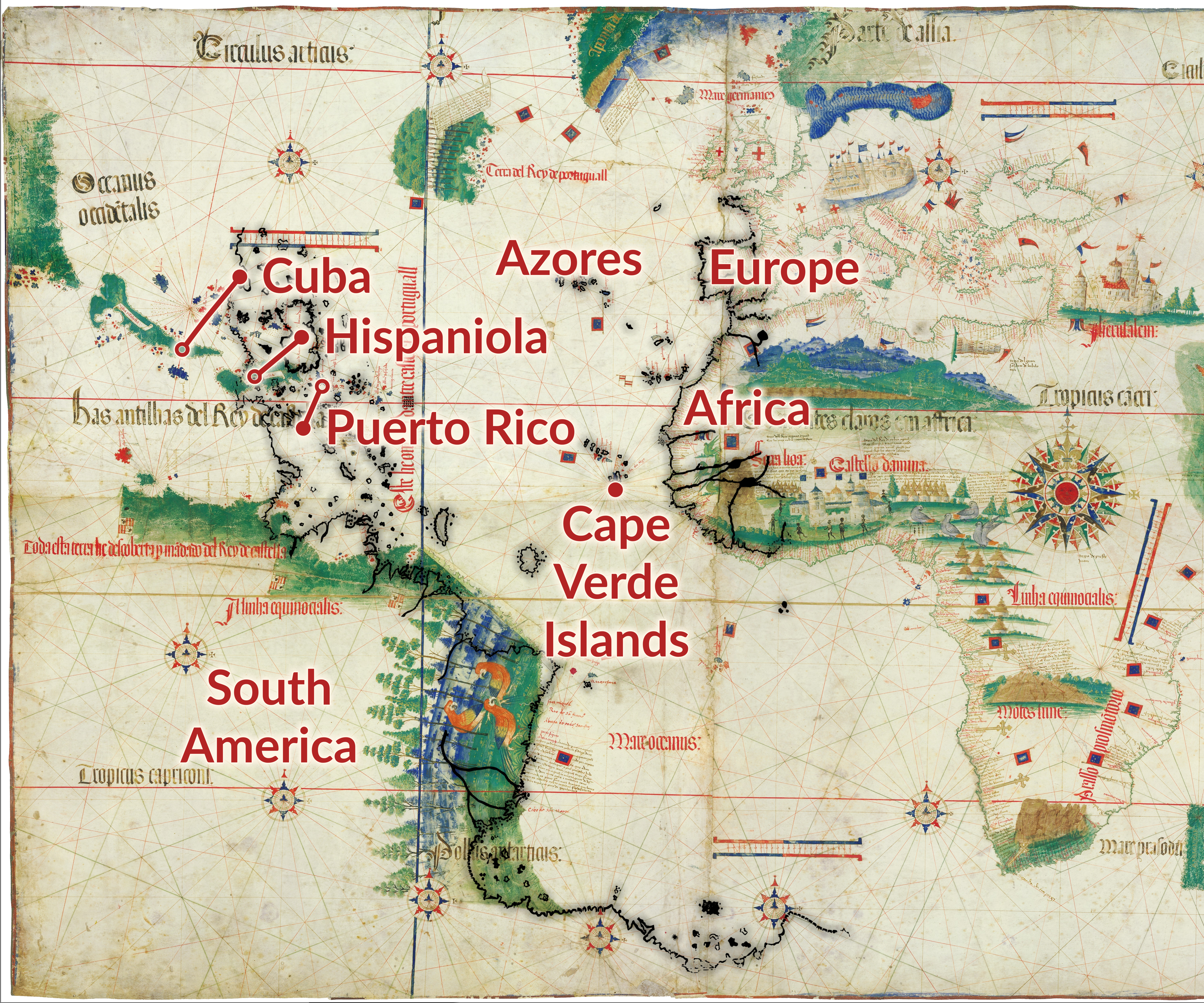
The Piri Reis map's coastlines (outlined in black) are laid over the 1502 Cantino Planisphere, an earlier portolan world map. They show similarities and increased detail on Piri Reis' South American coast. The peculiar configuration of the Caribbean is usually attributed to the usage of an early map from Columbus, now lost.

Compared to the Islamic cartography of the era, the map shows an atypical knowledge of foreign discoveries. During the Age of Discovery, European voyages expanded the known world and disrupted the traditional conception of an "inhabited quarter" of the world comparable to the Greek ecumene. The attitudes towards the Age of Discovery within the Ottoman Empire ranged from passive indifference to the outright rejection of foreign influence.

Piri Reis synthesizes traditional worldviews with discoveries by undermining their newness, using rhetorical strategies to reframe European discoveries as the rediscovery of ancient knowledge. He invokes Dhu al-Qarnayn—believed to be a reference to Alexander the Great from the Quran—in his inscriptions regarding Columbus. According to the Quran and Turkish literary tradition, Alexander traveled to every corner of the world, thereby defining its limits. A marginal inscription describes world maps as "charts drawn in the days of Alexander". Another inscription mentions that a "book fell into the hands" of Columbus describing lands "at the end of the Western Sea". In the 1526 version of Piri Reis' atlas, the Kitab-ı Bahriye, he explicitly credits European discoveries to lost works created during legendary voyages of Alexander. (Note: "My friend, the Franks both read and write everything there is to know about the science of the sea. But do not suppose that they invented such knowledge on their own; and if you wish, I will explain why. During his time, the famous ruler Alexander traveled over all the seas, and whatever he saw and whatever he heard he had recorded, item by item, by a competent person. In this way he had a full description of the entire sea compiled and written down" (Piri Reis 1526, via Casale 2019, p. 875).)

Compared to earlier portolan charts, the map shows gradual improvement. Portuguese source maps would have been similar to surviving maps like the 1502 Cantino Planisphere. Compared to the planisphere and the earlier map of Juan de la Cosa (1500): the Atlantic Ocean is accurate, South America is highly detailed, and the Caribbean is strangely organized. As a part of the expanding cartography of the sixteenth century, the map was soon surpassed. Piri Reis's own 1528 map included a more detailed and accurate version of the New World. Despite recent claims of an anomalous level of accuracy, (Note: This began with Captain Arlington Mallery, who created essentially new maps by repositioning the points of the Piri Reis fragment onto a grid that he created (McIntosh 2000a, p. 53). In his 1971 collection of fringe theories, journalist and ufologist, John Keel, summarized Mallery's maps as "accurate as the latest charts" and claimed that Charles Hapgood "found that the ancient maps were never more than five degrees off" (Keel 1971, p. 14). Keel summarized how subsequent writers used Hapgood's work to "advance belief in everything from lost Atlantis to extraterrestrial visitants", due to a perceived anomalous level of accuracy, that would have made the Piri Reis map an erratic find (Keel 1971, p. 17). When the actual map (not a corrected version) is compared to modern maps, the accuracy is mixed and does not seem to be unusual for the sixteenth century (Dutch 2010).) Gregory McIntosh, in comparing it to several other portolan-style maps of the era, found that:

The Piri Reis map is not the most accurate map of the sixteenth century, as has been claimed, there being many, many world maps produced in the remaining eighty-seven years of that century that far surpass it in accuracy. The Ribeiro maps of the 1520s and 1530s, the Ortelius map of 1570, and the Wright-Molyneux map of 1599 ('the best map of the sixteenth century') are only a few better-known examples.

== Iconography ==
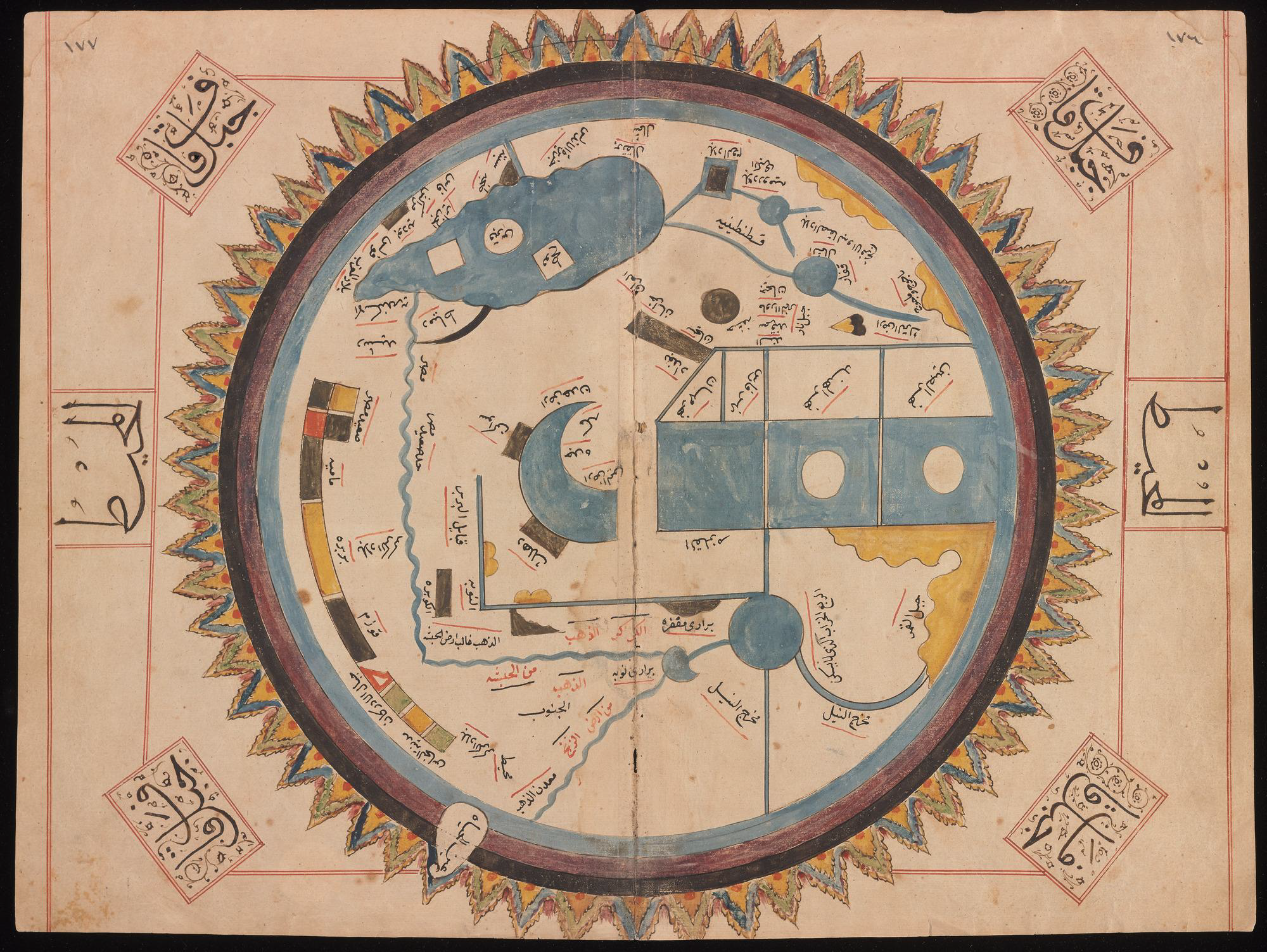
Schematic map

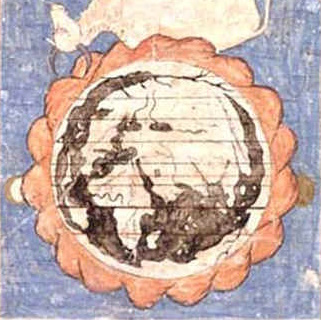
Mimetic map

Two sixteenth-century manuscripts of Zakariya al-Qazwini's The Wonders of Creation: One provides a traditional schematic map of the "inhabited quarter" of the world surrounded by ocean. The other provides a more mimetic world map that incorporates recent discoveries. (Note: Both maps have been rotated 180 degrees to position north at the top of the map. In the full illustration of the mimetic map, the world rests upon the back of Kujata standing on a fish swimming in the cosmic ocean contained within a bowl held aloft by the wings of an angel.)

Piri Reis's inclusion of many foreign accounts was atypical within the Ottoman Empire. After the conquest of Constantinople, Sultan Mehmed II began a project of creating copies of traditional Islamic maps in the Book of Roads and Kingdoms tradition. (Note: Often called the Balkhī school of map making (Bellino 2014, p. 273), and referred to by Karen Pinto as KMMS (Kitāb al-masālik wa-al-mamālik) maps (Pinto 2012, p. 76). Of the thirty-five remaining Istakhri manuscripts, six originate from this period in Istanbul (Pinto 2011, p. 159).) Piri Reis adapted the elements of iconography from the traditional maps—which illustrated well-known routes, cities, and peoples—to the portolan portrayals of newly discovered coasts.

Piri Reis provides an unusual etymology of "Ocean" as coming from "Ovo Sano", or "sound egg". The accepted etymology comes from the world-encircling river, Oceanus. Historian Svat Soucek has described the egg etymology as naive. Historian Karen Pinto has proposed that the egg etymology is better understood in the context of traditional attitudes towards the deep seas in Islamic culture. Typical medieval world maps followed a standardized and schematic design, with a disc-shaped "inhabited quarter" of the world separated from Mount Qaf by an impassable Encircling Ocean. Pinto observed that Piri Reis had reconciled the discovery of new land beyond the sea with this existing model, by framing the Old World—ocean included—as a giant lake surrounded by the shores of the New World. The Ottoman miniatures that illuminate the map can be further interpreted in the context of new possibilities and the changing cultural landscape.

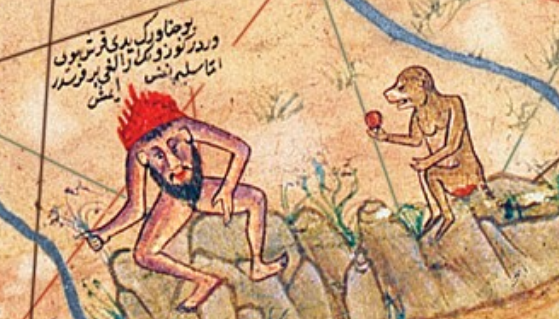
Along the map's Western edge, a headless Blemmye (left, holding flowers) converses peacefully with a monkey (right, holding fruit).

The Western fringe of the map is populated by a variety of strange monsters from medieval mappaemundi and bestiaries. Among the mountains in South America, a headless man is depicted interacting with a monkey. The headless men, known as Blemmyes, were portrayed in medieval maps and books as threatening. In Islamic culture, monkeys were considered ill omens. The caption states that despite the monsters' appearance, they "are harmless souls," which contrasts with previous depictions of both the headless men and the edge of the known world. Pinto characterized the map's monsters as, "a distinct break with earlier, and in fact, co-terminus manuscript traditions, which enforce and reinforce the notion that the Encircling Ocean is full of scary beasts and therefore should not be crossed." In addition to the Blemmye, several other creatures from Natural History by Pliny the Elder inhabit the Americas. (Note: These later appeared in many medieval works like the Marvels of Creation (Massetti & Veracini 2016, p. 48).) The dog-faced man shown dancing with a monkey is one of the cynocephaly; a monoceros and yale are shown on the South American coast; and a bonnacon is shown on the Southern Continent. Other creatures likely originate in Arabic and Persian bestiaries. The multi-horned beast on the bottom edge of the map may represent the legendary shadhavar, said to emit music as wind blows through its hollow horns.

== Caribbean ==
Comparison of Piri Reis's organization of the Caribbean (left) to the 1492 Martin Behaim globe's configuration of Asia (right)

The Caribbean islands and the coastline in the Northwest corner of the map are widely believed to be based on a lost map drawn by Christopher Columbus, or under his supervision. The western coast on the map combines features of Central America and Cuba, reflecting Columbus's claim that Cuba was part of an Asian mainland. During the 1494 exploration of Cuba, Columbus was so adamant that he had found Asia, (Note: Cathay was a historical name for China, and Marco Polo described Mangi as directly south of Cathay. Columbus identified the native placename, Mago, for a region on the southern side of Cuba as Marco Polo's Mangi (McIntosh 2000a, p. 103). He wrote of Cuba, "I thought it must be the mainland, the province of Cathay... . At length, after the proceeding of many leagues, and finding that nothing new presented itself, and that the coast was leading me northwards" (McIntosh 2000a, p. 106).) that he had a notary board each of his ships anchored off the coast. Columbus compelled his men to swear that Cuba was a part of Asia and agree to never contradict this interpretation "under a penalty of 10,000 maravedis and the cutting out of the tongue". (Note: Historian Joaquim Gaspar has suggested that both Columbus's notary stunt and his creation of a map with Hispaniola rotated to match Japan were an attempt to motivate his own men with the unattainable promise of wealth upon reaching India. Gaspar points out the difficulty in navigating the Caribbean by compass using a map with a second north and Cuba unfolded into a North–South coast (Gaspar 2015, pp. 3–4). McIntosh suggests the possibility of an unofficial map for navigation, and an official map presented as evidence of his continued claims of having discovered a route to Asia (McIntosh 2000a, pp. 136–137).) The mainland in the extreme northwest is labeled with place-names from Columbus's voyages along the coasts of Cuba. For example, a stretch of coast is labelled Ornofay, as recorded by Columbus but depicted on no other maps. (Note: Akçura transliterates the name as Kawpunta Arofi, (Akçura 1935) and McIntosh transliterates it as Kaw Punta Orofay. McIntosh offers two plausible readings of the name as "Cape Point Ornofay" or "Cuba, Point Ornofay", (McIntosh 2000a, pp. 104–105).)

Peculiar features of the Caribbean can be attributed to Columbus. Notably, a massive Hispaniola is oriented north to south. Columbus traveled West with a chart from Paolo dal Pozzo Toscanelli that—west of the Canary Islands—showed open ocean, mythical Antilia, and Cipangu (Marco Polo's Japan) between Europe and Asia. The general position and shape of Hispaniola are similar to contemporary maps of Cipangu. On 26 December 1492, the day after Columbus landed at La Navidad on the northern coast of Hispaniola, he wrote in his diary of "Cipango, which [the native people] call Cibao" on "the island of Española". The absence of the island's distinctive Gulf of Gonâve is more evidence of a Columbian origin because he did not explore Hispaniola's western shore. According to Gregory McIntosh, the most clearly matching coastlines are around Cabo Falso in Pedernales. The island near Cabo Falso is labelled with a Turkish translation of Alto Velo Island, explored and named by Columbus on his second voyage in August 1494. The peninsulas protruding from Puerto Rico are not present in reality but are also depicted on the map of Juan de la Cosa, who sailed with Columbus. İle Bele near Puerto Rico is possibly Vieques, named Gratiosa, or Graceful, by Columbus.

There is disagreement on how much of the map draws from Columbus. Kahle and most later scholars attributed everything north and west of the phantom island Antilia to this source. Soucek expressed doubts about Kahle's claim, which included some of the South American coast. McIntosh found that Cuba, Central America, The Bahamas, and Hispaniola could be clearly attributed to an early map from Columbus, but not the Lesser Antilles, especially the Virgin Islands which are duplicated on the map.

== Southern Continent ==
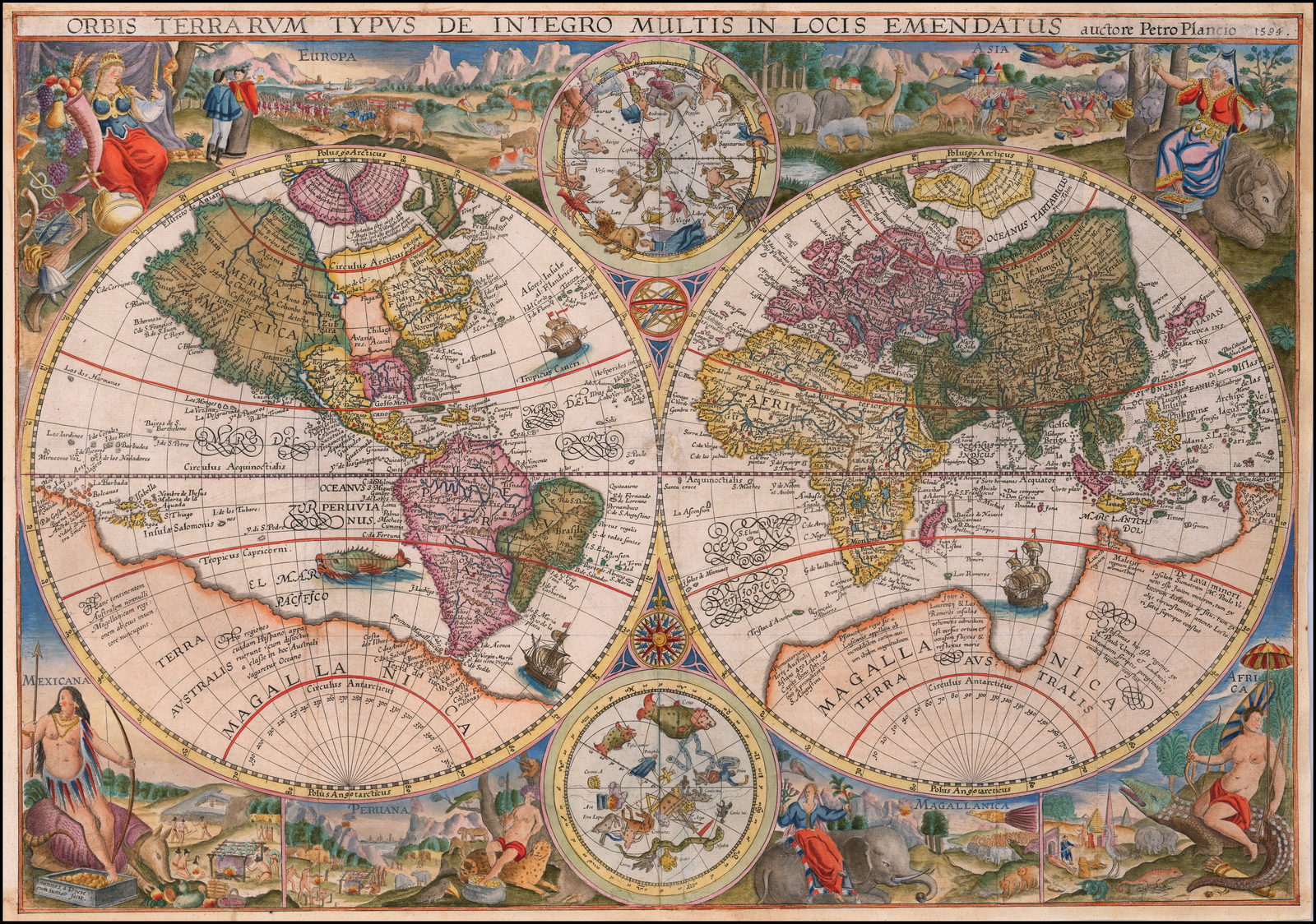
Terra Australis, or the Southern Land, is depicted on Petrus Plancius's Orbis Terrarum of 1594 as a massive continent, spanning much of the southern hemisphere. Places discovered but little understood are depicted as the Northern edge of Terra Australis, including Tierra del Fuego south of the Americas and New Guinea.

The Southern Continent stretching across the Atlantic Ocean is most likely Terra Australis. Some authors have claimed that it depicts areas of South America not officially discovered in 1513, and a popular but disproven hypothesis alleges it to be Antarctica. Maps of the period generally depicted this theoretical southern continent, in various configurations. This land was posited by Roman geographer Ptolemy as a counterbalance to the extensive land areas in the known world. (Note: Marcus Tullius Cicero used the term cingulus australis (southern zone) in referring to the Antipodes in Somnium Scipionis (Dream of Scipio): "Duo [cingulis] sunt habitabiles, quorum australis ille, in quo qui insistunt adversa vobis urgent vestigia, nihil ad vestrum genus (Two of them [the five belts or zones that gird and surround the earth] are habitable, of which the southern, whose inhabitants are your antipodes, bears no relation to your people) [p. 18]" (Hiatt 2012, pp. 10–18).)

As explorers charted the Southern Hemisphere, it pushed back the potential bounds of Terra Australis. Discoveries, like Tierra del Fuego and New Holland, were initially mapped as the northern edge of the unknown southern land. As these areas were mapped, Terra Australis shrank, grew vague, and became a fantastical locale invoked in literature, notably Gulliver's Travels and Gabriel de Foigny's La Terre Australe Connue. Belief in the Southern Continent was abandoned after the second voyage of James Cook in the 1770s showed that if it existed, it was much smaller than imagined previously. The first confirmed landing on Antarctica was only during the First Russian Antarctic Expedition in 1820, and the coastline of Queen Maud Land did not see significant exploration before Norwegian expeditions began in 1891.

=== South American claims ===
The southernmost conclusively identified feature on the map is a stretch of Brazilian coastline including Cabo Frio (Kav Friyo on the map), possibly the earliest depiction of Rio de Janeiro, and likely the area around Cananéia, labeled Katino on the map. Information about this area is attributed to recent Portuguese voyages, and the southernmost point depicted on contemporary Portuguese maps was Cananéia as described by Amerigo Vespucci, at 25 degrees south. Beyond this point, the coast curves sharply east. Some modern writers have interpreted this coastline as the coast of South America, either drawn along the map's edge or distorted to push it East of the line of demarcation. Cartographic historian Svat Soucek noted that the parchment curves by South America, and that "it was not unusual for cartographers to adjust the orientation of a coastline to fit the surface available". Italian art historian and graphic designer Diego Cuoghi said that "Piri Reis often mentions Portuguese maps in his notes, and of course Portuguese would have preferred the coast south of Brazil to bend sharply to the right". This identification relies on perceived visual similarities between the map and modern maps of the Río de la Plata, San Matías Gulf, Valdés Peninsula, and Strait of Magellan's Atlantic opening. Aside from the subjective comparisons, there is no historical evidence that Piri Reis could have known of these places and no textual evidence in the map. In particular, the large snakes like those of the Boidae family mentioned on the map, are not found that far south in Patagonia.

=== Antarctic claims ===
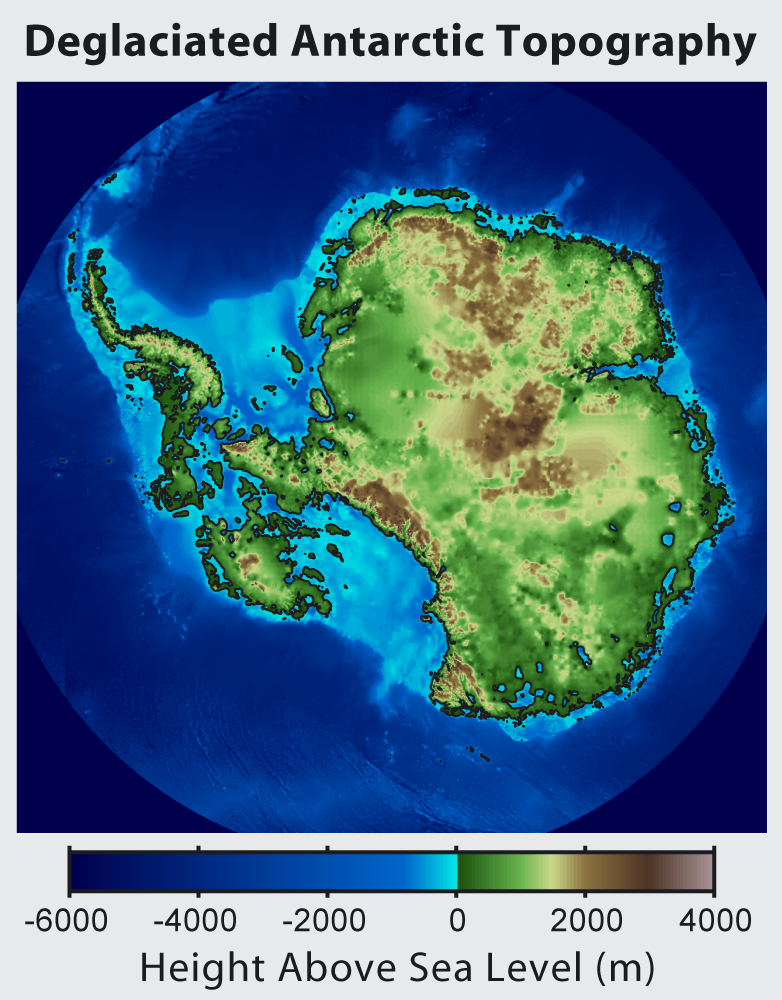
The expected topography of Antarctica using modern data and accounting for isostatic rebound shows no similarities with the Piri Reis map.

The Antarctic claim originates with Captain Arlington H. Mallery, a civil engineer and amateur archaeologist who was a supporter of pre-Columbian trans-oceanic contact hypotheses. Mallery used a grid system to reposition the coordinates on the map and claimed the accuracy of these reconstructed maps to be comparable to modern maps. (Note: "Midway in my research on the old charts and maps, I discovered that the grids marked on them were incorrect. After deciding that these incorrect grids had probably been added much later by persons other than the original draftsman, I removed them and worked out what I consider to be the correct grids. During this time it became obvious that each map or chart was an assembly of several charts and/or maps of contiguous areas and that the separate charts or maps combined to produce a single map were not all drawn to the same zero point (Mallery & Harrison 1979, p. 145)") Mallery's ideas were exposed to a wider audience when Georgetown University broadcast a discussion between Mallery, director of the Weston Observatory Daniel Lineham, and director of the Georgetown University Observatory Francis Heyden in 1956. Inspired by Mallery, historian Charles Hapgood, in his 1966 book Maps of the Ancient Sea Kings, proposed a theory of global exploration by a pre-classical undiscovered civilization based on his analysis of Renaissance and late-medieval maps. Hapgood's book was met with skepticism due to its lack of evidence and reliance on polar shift. (Note: For examples of scholarly reviews see: Wallis, Helen (1967), "Reviewed Work(s): Maps of the Ancient Sea Kings: Evidence of Advanced Civilization in the Ice Age by Charles H. Hapgood", The Geographical Journal, 133 (3): 394–395, doi:10.2307/1793597, JSTOR 1793597, "In arguing that there was no known way of establishing longitude in Columbus's day and until the mid-eighteenth century (p. 41-2) he overlooks the sailor's skill in estimating longitude by dead-reckoning."; Stunkel, Kenneth R. (1967), "Reviewed Work(s): Maps of the Ancient Sea Kings: Evidence of Advanced Civilization in the Ice Age by Charles Hapgood", Geographical Review, 57 (3): 440–442, doi:10.2307/212645, JSTOR 212645, "The gnawing weakness of Hapgood's thesis is the absence of credible supporting evidence. His use of history, archeology, linguistics, and mythology has the character of improvisation. The geological evidence seems inconclusive. That leaves the maps, and he has convinced me of their antiquity only, not of their origin in the last ice age."; Davies, Gordon L. Herries (1985), "Reviewed Work(s): Maps of the Ancient Sea Kings. Evidence of Advanced Civilization in the Ice Age by Charles H. Hapgood", Imago Mundi, 37: 108–109, JSTOR 1150840, "Not only does his thesis involve the gratuitous invention of a late-Pleistocene civilization, but he is forced to invoke catastrophic earth movements in a manner which can only provoke geological amazement and laughter.".) Hapgood acknowledged that his theory disregarded the text and some of the placement of land masses on the map. For example, he designated an island to be one-half of Cuba—claiming it was "wrongly labeled Espaniola" or Hispaniola—and remarked that, "nothing could better illustrate how ignorant Piri Re'is was of his own map."

Hapgood, and his graduate students who aided with the research, were influential in spreading the idea that the Piri Reis map shows Antarctica as it looked during the Neolithic, without glacial ice. Two letters reproduced in Hapgood's book express optimism about this hypothesis based on the 1949 Norwegian-British-Swedish Seismic Survey of Queen Maud Land. (Note: Lt. Colonel Harold Ohlmeyer wrote that, "the lower part of the map agrees very remarkably with the results of the Seismic profile made across the top of the ice cap by the [...] Expedition of 1949", and Captain Lorenzo Burroughs wrote in agreement based on the same 1949 expedition. Hapgood and Burroughs also cite the International Geophysical Year subglacial studies, but only in regards to an unrelated map by Oronce Fine (Hapgood 1979, pp. 224–225).) According to geologist Paul Heinrich, this mistakenly conflates the topography of Antarctica below the ice with a hypothetical ice-free Antarctica. It does not take into account post-glacial rebound, where land rises after massive ice sheets melt away. Additionally, the 1949 survey could not measure even one percent of the area drawn in the Piri Reis map. Subsequent studies with access to more data have shown no significant similarities to Antarctica's coast beneath the ice or a projected Antarctic coastline without ice.

Hapgood mistakenly believed that Antarctica had been free of ice in 17,000 BC and partially ice-free as late as 4,000 BC. This erroneous date range could have put the mapping of Antarctica contemporary with many known prehistoric societies. More recent ice core data shows that Antarctica was last free of ice over ten million years ago. Writers like Erich von Daniken, Donald Keyhoe, and Graham Hancock have uncritically repeated Hapgood's claims as proof of ancient astronauts, flying saucers, and a lost civilization comparable to Atlantis, respectively.

== See also ==
- Cedid Atlas
- Geography in medieval Islam
- Early world maps
- World map
- Waldseemüller map
- Johannes Schöner globes, made in 1515 and 1520. Also shows a Southern Continent at the South Pole.
