= Nicolay de Caveri =

15th-16th century Genoese cartographer

Nicolay de Caveri (14??-15??) was a map-maker from Genoa, Italy. He has also been known as Nicolay Canerio, Nicolo Caveri, Nicolo Canerio, Nicolaus de Caveri, Nicolaus de Caverio, Nicholas de Caveri, and Nicolai de Caveri, all based upon variant readings of his signature on the back of his famous manuscript map.

His map of 1503 or 1504 was the primary source map used to draw the Western Hemisphere on the Waldseemüller map in 1507.

== See also ==
- Caverio map
- Ancient world maps
- World map
