= Carlos Sanz (historian of cartography) =

Spanish publisher and historian

Carlos Sanz (1903-1981) was a Spanish publisher and historian of cartography based in Madrid. He died at the end of 1981. He donated books and maps to the University of Miami.

== Works ==
- (ed.) La Carta de Colón anunciando el descubrimiento del Nuevo Mundo, 15 febrero-14 marzo, 1493 by Christopher Columbus, 1956
- Primitivas relaciones de España con Asia y Oceanía: los dos primeros libros impresos en Filipinas, mas un tercero en discordia, 1957
- (ed.) Primera historia de China, Sevilla, 1577 by Bernardino de Escalente, 1958
- Bibliografía general de la Carta de Colón, 1958
- (ed.) Bibliotheca Americana vetustissima; a description of works relating to America published between the years 1492 and 1551 by Henry Harrisse. Madrid, 1958
- La Geographia de Ptolomeo, ampliada con los primeros mapas impresos de América, desde 1507; estudio bibliográfico y crítico, con el catálogo de las ediciones aparecidas desde 1475 a 1883, comentado e ilustrado, 1959
- El nombre América; libros y mapas que lo impusieron, 1959
- El gran secreto de la Carta de Colón (crítica histórica) y otras adiciones a la Bibliotheca Americana vetustissima, 1959
- Bibliotheca Americana vetustissima: comentario crítico e índice general cronológico de los seis volúmenes que componen la obra, 1960
- Mapas antiguos del mundo: siglos XV-XVI. 2 vols. Madrid, 1962.
- (ed.) Diario de Colón; libro de la primera navegación y descubrimiento de las Indias by Christopher Columbus, 1962
- Cartografia histórica de los descubrimientos australes, 1967
- Australia. Su descubrimiento y denominación. Con la reproducción facsímil de Memorial número 8 de Quirós en español original, y en las diversas traducciones contemporáneas, 1973
- Hacia el descubrimiento del verdadero ser de la historia?: conferencia pronunciada en la Fundación Universitaria Española el día 21 de marzo de 1974, 1974
