= Cantino planisphere =

Portuguese world map c. 1502

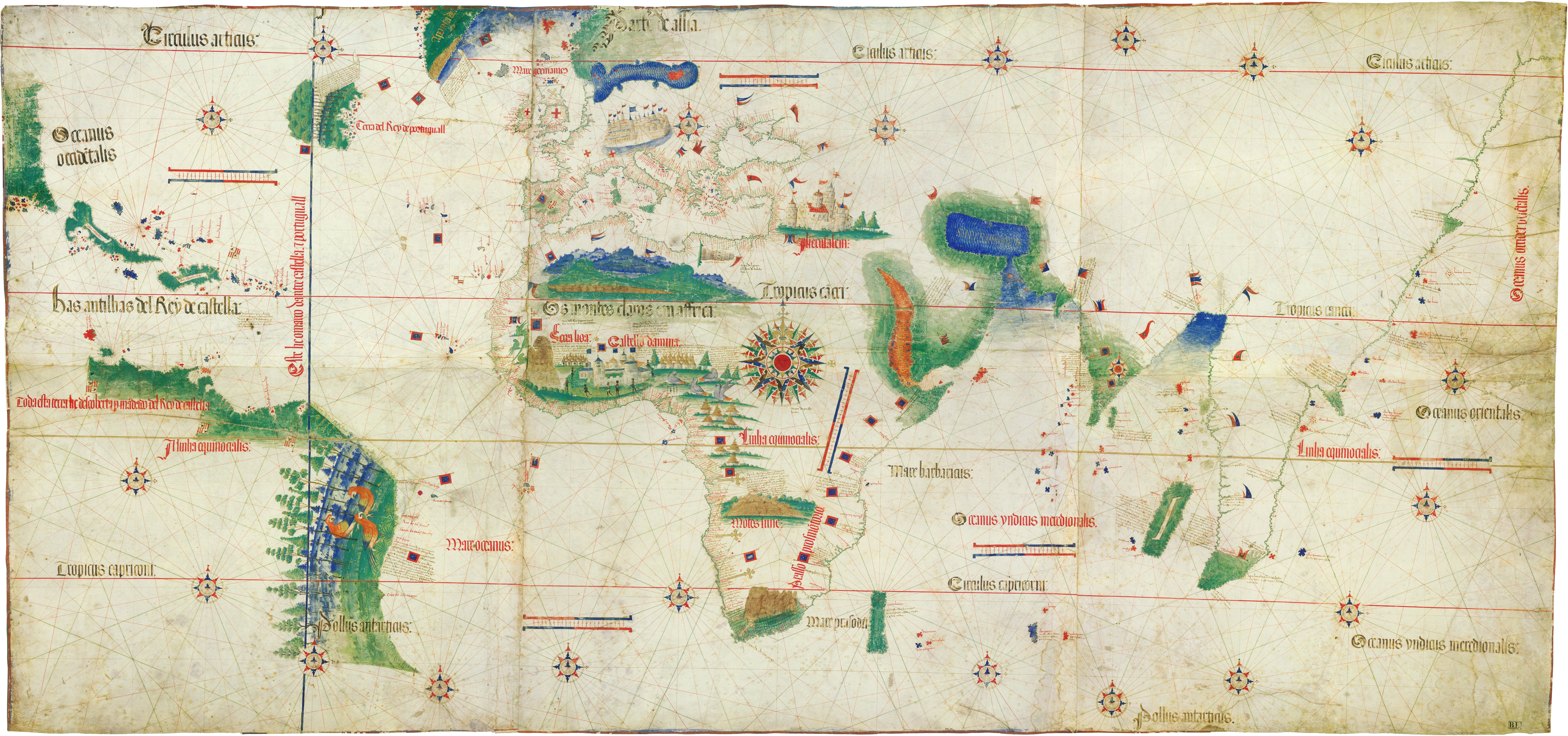
Cantino planisphere (1502), Biblioteca Estense, Modena, Italy

The Cantino planisphere or Cantino world map is a manuscript Portuguese world map preserved at the Biblioteca Estense in Modena, Italy. It is named after Alberto Cantino, an agent for the Duke of Ferrara, who successfully smuggled it from Portugal to Italy in 1502. It measures 220 cm × 105 cm (87 in × 41 in).

The planisphere is the earliest surviving map showing Portuguese geographic discoveries in the east and west and is particularly notable for portraying a fragmentary record of the Brazilian coast, which the Portuguese explorer Pedro Álvares Cabral explored in 1500, the southern coast of Greenland, studied in the late 1490s, and the African coast of the Atlantic and Indian oceans with remarkable accuracy and detail.

It was valuable at the beginning of the sixteenth century because it showed detailed and up-to-date strategic information when geographic knowledge of the world was growing rapidly. It remains important today because it contains unique historical information about the maritime exploration and the evolution of nautical cartography during the Age of Discovery. The Cantino planisphere is the earliest extant nautical chart depicting places in Africa and parts of Brazil and India according to their latitudes.

== History ==
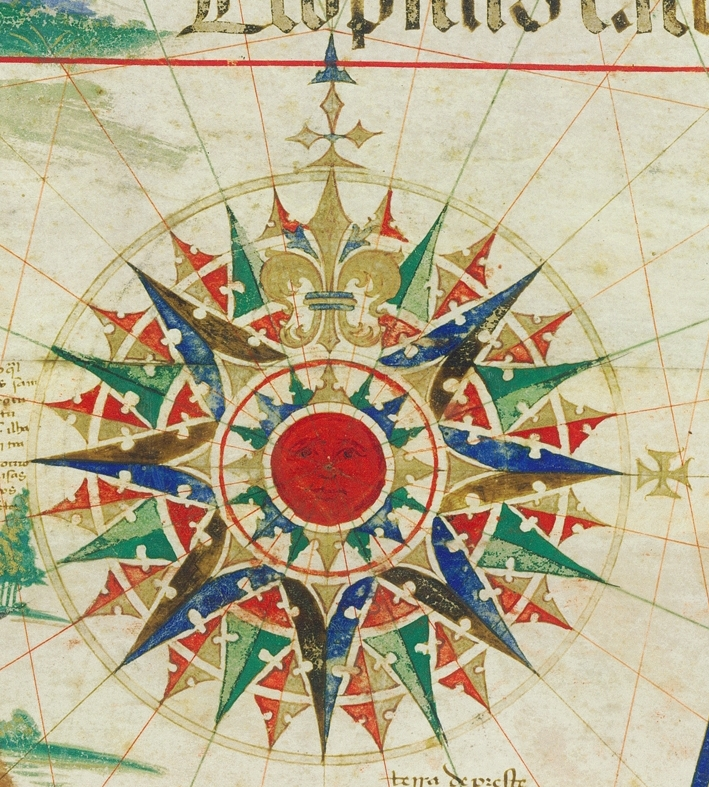
Major wind rose of the Cantino planisphere

At the beginning of the 16th century, Lisbon was a buzzing metropolis where people from diverse backgrounds searched for work, glory or fortune. There were also many undercover agents looking for the secrets brought by the Portuguese voyages to remote lands. Among them was Alberto Cantino, who was sent to Portugal by Ercole I d'Este, Duke of Ferrara, with the formal intention of horse trading, while secretly collecting information on Portuguese discoveries.

A popular theory, introduced in the earliest studies of the map, suggests that the Cantino Planisphere was ordered to an official Portuguese mapmaker, who made a copy of the royal cartographic pattern, the so-called Padrão Real, kept in the Armazéns da Índia. However, there is no historical evidence that such an order was ever made, and the presence of numerous mistakes weakens the theory. If it existed in Portugal at that time, one would expect that a carefully made copy of an official standard would be accurate. A more plausible explanation is that the map was surreptitiously acquired shortly after it was made for some nobleman or official client. From a letter sent by Cantino to his patron, the Duke of Ferrara, on 19 November 1502, we know that he paid 12 golden ducats for it, which was a considerable amount for the time. An Italian inscription on the back of the map reads: Carta de navigar per le Isole nouam trovate in le parte de India: dono Alberto Cantino al S. Duca Hercole, which translates as "Navigational chart of the islands recently [discovered]... in part of the Indies: from Alberto Cantino to Duke Hercole".

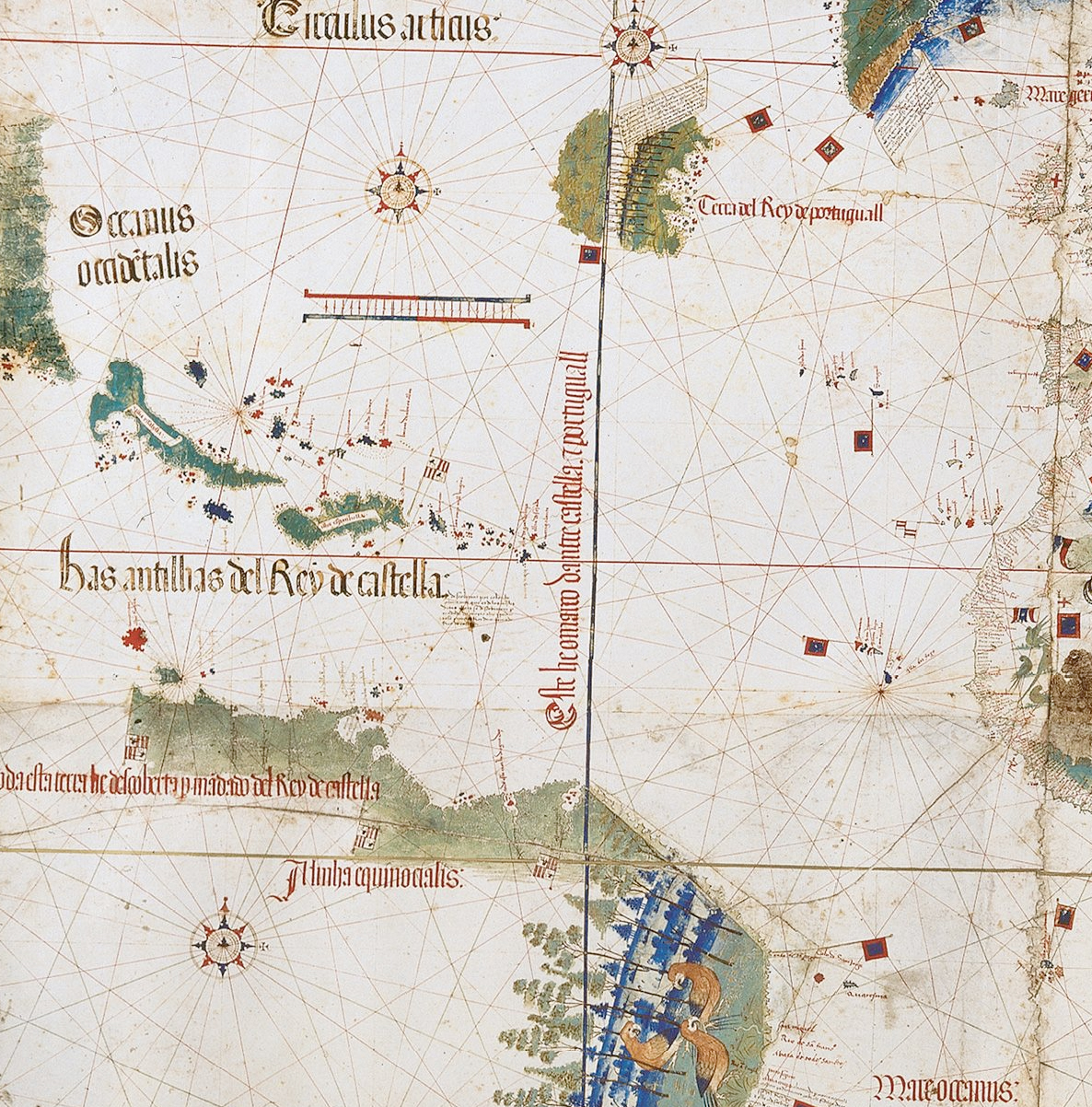
The Treaty of Tordesillas line

While it enlightened the Italians about many new territories yet unknown to them, subsequent Portuguese mapping voyages made their maps obsolete within months. Nevertheless, its importance to the Portuguese–Italian trade relations should not be understated; this map provided the Italians with knowledge of Brazil's coastline and much of the Atlantic Coast of South America long before other nations even knew South America extended so far to the south. It also supplied great details of the Indian Ocean.

The geographical information given on the Cantino map was copied into the Italian-made Canerio (or Caveri) map shortly after the Cantino map arrived in Italy. The Canerio, in turn, became the primary source for the design of the newly discovered western lands on the highly influential wall map of the world produced by Martin Waldseemüller in 1507 under the auspices of Rene, Duke of Lorraine.

This old map, made of six glued parchment sheets, was kept in the Ducal Library, Ferrara, for about 90 years, until Pope Clement VIII transferred it to another palace in Modena, Italy. More than two centuries later, in 1859, the palace was ransacked, and the Cantino Map was lost. That same year, Giuseppe Boni, Director of Biblioteca Estense, found it in a butcher's store in Modena. The Cantino world map is currently in Modena, Italy, at the Biblioteca Estense.

== Construction ==
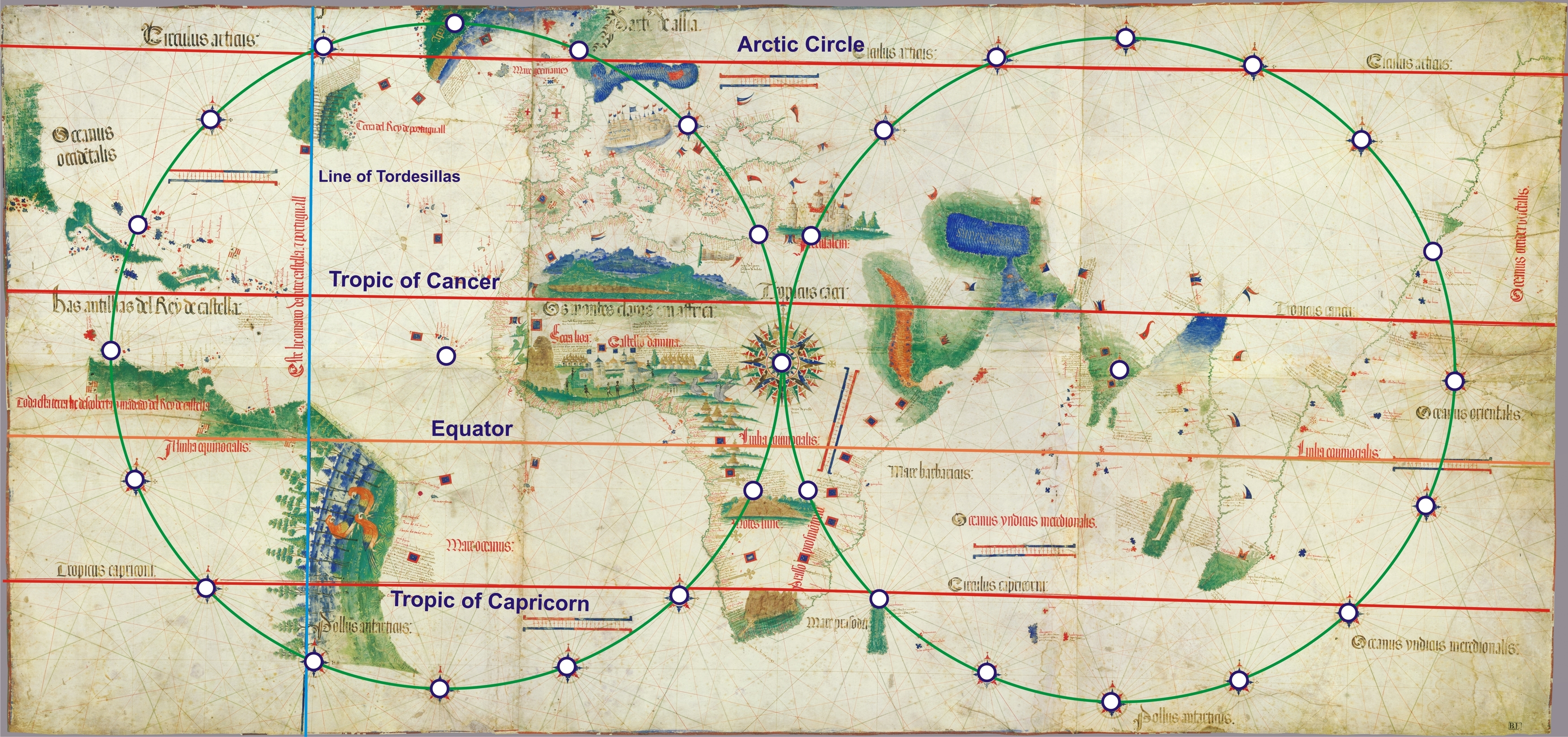
The rhumb-line construction scheme and geographic lines in the Cantino planisphere. Adapted from Gaspar (2012), Plate 3

The Cantino planisphere is the earliest example of the so-called latitude chart, which was developed following the introduction of astronomical navigation during the second half of the fifteenth century. Contrary to the portolan charts of the Mediterranean, which were constructed based on magnetic courses and estimated distances between places, in the latitude chart, places were represented according to their latitudes. In the Cantino planisphere, latitudes were incorporated only in the coasts of Africa, Brazil and India, while Europe and the Caribbean Sea continued to be represented according to the portolan-chart model.

The construction of the rhumb line system in the Cantino planisphere uses two circles (some charts use only one, others use as many as three, depending on size): the western circle is centered on the Cape Vert islands, the eastern circle is centered in India. The circumference of each circle is marked with sixteen equally spaced points, from which radiate the 32 classic rhumbs: 0°, 11 1/4°, 22 1/2°, 33 3/4°, etc. The western and eastern outer circles are tangent to each other at a large wind-rose in central Africa, with a fleur-de-lis indicating North. This dense rhumb-line mesh was used in navigation to reference reading and marking directions (courses) between places. Six scale bars graduated in Iberian leagues, with a variable number of sections (or logs), are distributed over the chart's area. These were used to measure distances between places.

Illustrations are few, but elaborate. Two cities are grandly depicted - Venice and Jerusalem. There is also an elaborate depiction of the Portuguese castle of São Jorge da Mina (Elmina Castle, on the Gold Coast of West Africa), flanked by two African towns. Other illustrations include a lion-shaped mountain representing the Sierra Leone mountain range, the Tower of Babel (laid horizontally), the mythical Mountains of the Moon (legendary source of the Nile River) in central Africa, and the Table Mountain or Drakensberg range in South Africa. Along the central African coast are the various cross stone markers (padrões) erected by Diogo Cão and Bartolomeu Dias in the 1480s.

In North Africa, the "Montes Claros" is in the usual place of the Atlas Mountains. The legend below on the left reads that "this is the land of King Organo, whose king is very noble and very rich" and to the right that this is the "land of the King of Nubia, the king of which is continuously making war on Prester John and is a moor and a great enemy of Christians".

== Discoveries ==
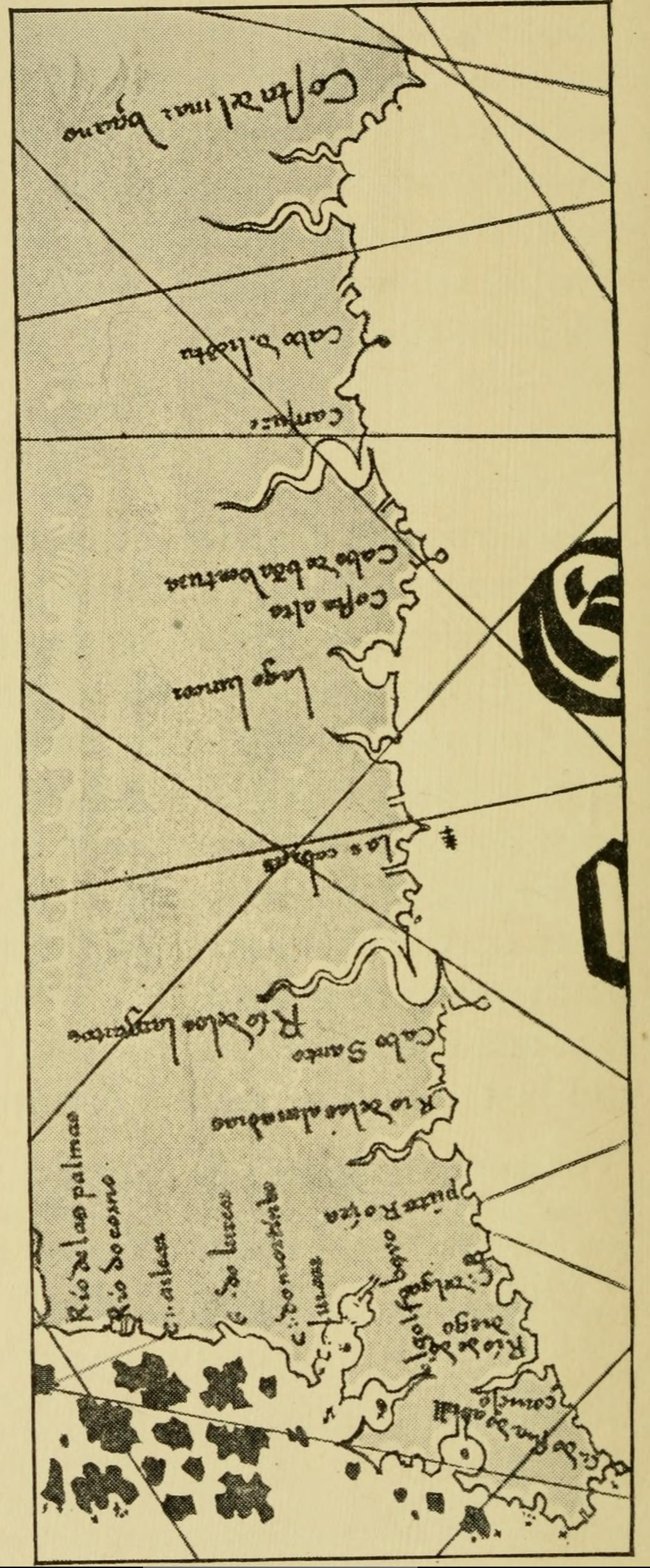
"The north-western continental land on the Cantino map (from the hand-copied reproduction accompanying Harisse's Les Corte Real)." – George Nunn (1924)

=== North America ===
By the time of the map's creation, European voyages had landed across the Atlantic Ocean. Christopher Columbus had completed his first three voyages to a land that he called both Cuba and Asia. John Cabot had completed three voyages from Bristol under Henry VII of England. Very little was known about Cabot's third voyage, including whether Cabot ever returned to England. While sailing to Greenland, known but little understood by contemporary Europeans, João Fernandes Lavrador made landfall on a nearby coast. Gaspar Corte-Real and his brother Miguel, members of the Portuguese royal household, sailed West under Manuel I of Portugal to find a Northwest Passage to Asia. Newfoundland, visited in 1500 and 1501 by the Corte-Real brothers, is labeled as Terra del Rey de Portuguall on the Cantino map.

The map features a peculiar landmass roughly in the location of North America. Several theories offer potential explanations for this land that terminates in a peninsula, labeled "C. do fim do abrill" or "Cape of the end of April", pointing towards the Caribbean. It has been linked to Asia, the Yucatan, Florida, and Cuba. The area includes a few defined cartographic details and names seemingly connected to the voyages of Columbus, Cabot, and Corte Real. Other maps depicting the same land include the Caverio map, the maps of Martin Waldseemüller, and the Johannes Schöner globes. These describe the land variously as Terra ultra incognita ("Land beyond unknown"), Vlterius incognita terra ("Land further beyond unknown"), Terra de Cvba ("Land of Cuba"), Parias (a native place name from Four Voyages of Amerigo Vespucci), and Asie partis ("Part of Asia").

=== South America ===
The Brazilian coast was certainly the last to be added and reached its present form in three phases: to the first belong an initial coastline running southeast from Golfo fremosso to Cabo Sam Jorge, and from there, to the north of Porto Seguro, continuing further south to the tip of the landmass. An inscription off Porto Seguro records the discovery and naming of Vera Cruz, as Brazil was initially called:

Porto Seguro. Vera Cruz, so called by this name, was found by Pedro Alvares Cabral, a gentleman of the household of the King of Portugal, which he discovered in going as commander of fourteen ships that the King sent to Calicut and, on the way to India, he came across this land here, which he thought to be mainland [terra firma], in which many people are observed, men and women, to walk about as naked as their mothers bore them: they are relatively fair-skinned than reddish brown and have very slick hair. This land was discovered in 1500.

Only a relatively small portion of the coast, between the flag near the Vera cruz inscription and the northern side of the baia de todos os santos, would have been surveyed in 1500 by the fleet of Pedro Álvares Cabral. To the second phase belongs the pasting of the strip of parchment between Rio de sã franc° and Golfo fremosso, which would have been based on the information brought by the fleet of João da Nova, who arrived in Lisbon in September 1502. In the third phase, the island named quaresma, and some names written in cursive, would have been added.

=== Greenland ===
The European rediscovery of Greenland is thought to have been made by João Fernandes Lavrador and Pedro de Barcelos between 1495 and 1498. The place was also visited by Giovanni Caboto (John Cabot), during the English expedition of 1498. However, the island's depiction on the map suggests that it was based on information gathered by the Portuguese mission of Labrador and Barcelos. Newfoundland was probably visited by an English expedition in 1497–98, and then visited by the Portuguese explorer Gaspar Corte-Real in 1500 and 1501. The map clarifies that the land was discovered and charted for King Manuel I of Portugal by Gaspar Corte-Real.

== See also ==
- Cartography of Latin America
- Early world maps
- Windrose network
- Map of Juan de la Cosa

== Bibliography and references ==
- Gaspar, Joaquim A. (2010) From the Portolan Chart of the Mediterranean to the Latitude Chart of the Atlantic: Cartometric Analysis and Modelling. Doctoral thesis. ISEGI, Universidade Nova de Lisboa
- Gaspar, Joaquim A. (2012) 'Blunders, Errors and Entanglements: Scrutining the Cantino planisphere with a Cartometric Eye', Imago Mundi, Vol. 64, Part 2: 181-200
- Gaspar, Joaquim Alves (2015). "The Representation of the West Indies in Early Iberian Cartography: A Cartometric Approach". Terrae Incognitae. 47 (1): 10–32. doi:10.1179/0082288415Z.00000000041. S2CID 128885931.
- Harisse, Henry (1883) Les Corte-Real e leurs voyages au Nouveau Monde. Paris
- Harisse, Henry (1892) The Discovery of North America: a Critical, Documentary, and Historic Investigation. London: Henry Stevens and Son; Paris: H. Welter.
- Harvey, Miles (2010). The Island of Lost Maps: A True Story of Cartographic Crime. Crown. ISBN 978-0-307-76656-4.
- Leite, Duarte (1923) 'O mais antigo mapa do Brasil', in História da Colonização Portuguesa do Brasil, vol. II, p. 223–81. Porto: Litografia Nacional
- Mota, Avelino Teixeira da (1977) A África no Planisfério Português Anónimo "Cantino" (1502). Centro de Estudos de Cartografia Antiga, Separate CII. Lisboa: Junta de Investigações do Ultramar.
- Nunn, George E. (1924). The Geographical Conceptions of Columbus: A Critical Consideration of Four Problems. 14. New York: American Geographical Society.
- Peck, Douglas T. (2003). "THE FIRST EUROPEAN CHARTING OF FLORIDA AND THE ADJACENT SHORES". The Florida Geographer. 34: 82–113.
- Pereira, Moacyr (1994) 'O Novo Mundo no Planisfério da Casa de Este, o "Cantino" '. Revista do Instituto Histórico e Geográfico Brasileiro, 155 (384), p. 680–718.
- Roukema, E. (1963) 'Brazil in the Cantino Map', Imago Mundi, Vol. 17, p. 7–26
