= Naming of the Americas =

Origin of the name of the continents, most likely named after Amerigo Vespucci

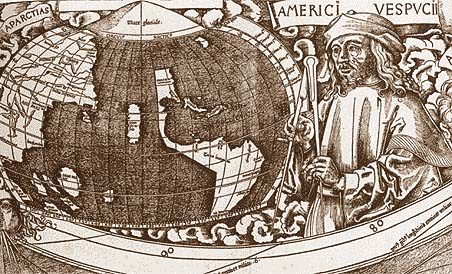
Amerigo Vespucci as depicted on the Waldseemüller map

The naming of the Americas occurred shortly after Christopher Columbus's death in 1506. The earliest known use of the name America dates to April 25, 1507, when it was applied to what is now known as South America by German cartographer Martin Waldseemüller for his world map now known as Waldseemüller map. It is generally accepted that he derived the "America" nomenclature from the name of Amerigo Vespucci, an Italian explorer, who explored the two continents on behalf of Spain and Portugal. Vespucci was at the time a popular author about his explorations of what he called the "New World". However, some have suggested other explanations, including being named after the Amerrisque mountain range in Nicaragua, or after Richard Amerike, a merchant from Bristol, England.

== Usage ==
In contemporary English, North and South America are generally considered separate continents, and taken together are called the Americas in the plural. When conceived as a unitary continent, the form is generally the continent of America in the singular. However, without a clarifying context, singular America in English commonly refers to the United States of America.

Historically, in the English-speaking world, the term America could refer to a single continent until the 1950s (as in Van Loon's Geography of 1937): According to historians Kären Wigen and Martin W. Lewis,

While it might seem surprising to find North and South America still joined into a single continent in a book published in the United States in 1937, such a notion remained fairly common until World War II. It cannot be coincidental that this idea served American geopolitical designs at the time, which sought both Western Hemispheric domination and disengagement from the "Old World" continents of Europe, Asia, and Africa. By the 1950s, however, virtually all American geographers had come to insist that the visually distinct landmasses of North and South America deserved separate designations.

This shift did not seem to happen in most other cultural hemispheres on Earth, such as Romance-speaking (including France, Belgium, Luxembourg, Italy, Portugal, Spain, Romania, Switzerland, Latin America, and the postcolonial Romance-speaking countries of Africa), Germanic (but excluding English) speaking (including Germany, Austria, Switzerland, Belgium, the Netherlands, Luxembourg, Denmark, Norway, Sweden, Iceland, and the Faroe Islands), and elsewhere, where America is still considered a continent encompassing the North America and South America subcontinents, as well as Central America.

== Earliest use of name ==
World map of Waldseemüller (Germany, 1507), which first used the name America (in the lower-left section, over South America)

The earliest known use of the name America dates to April 25, 1507, when it was applied to what is now known as South America. It appears on a small globe map with twelve time zones, together with the largest wall map made to date, both created by the German cartographer Martin Waldseemüller in Saint-Dié-des-Vosges in France. These were the first maps to show the Americas as a land mass separate from Asia. An accompanying book, Cosmographiae Introductio, anonymous but apparently written by Waldseemüller's collaborator Matthias Ringmann, states, "I do not see what right any one would have to object to calling this part [that is, the South American mainland], after Americus who discovered it and who is a man of intelligence, Amerigen, that is, the Land of Americus, or America: since both Europa and Asia got their names from women". America is also inscribed on the Paris Green Globe (or Globe vert) which has been attributed to Waldseemüller and dated to 1506–07: as well as the single name inscribed on the northern and southern parts of the New World, the continent also bears the inscription: America ab inuentore nuncupata (America, named after its discoverer).

Mercator on his 1569 map called North America "America or New India" (America sive India Nova).

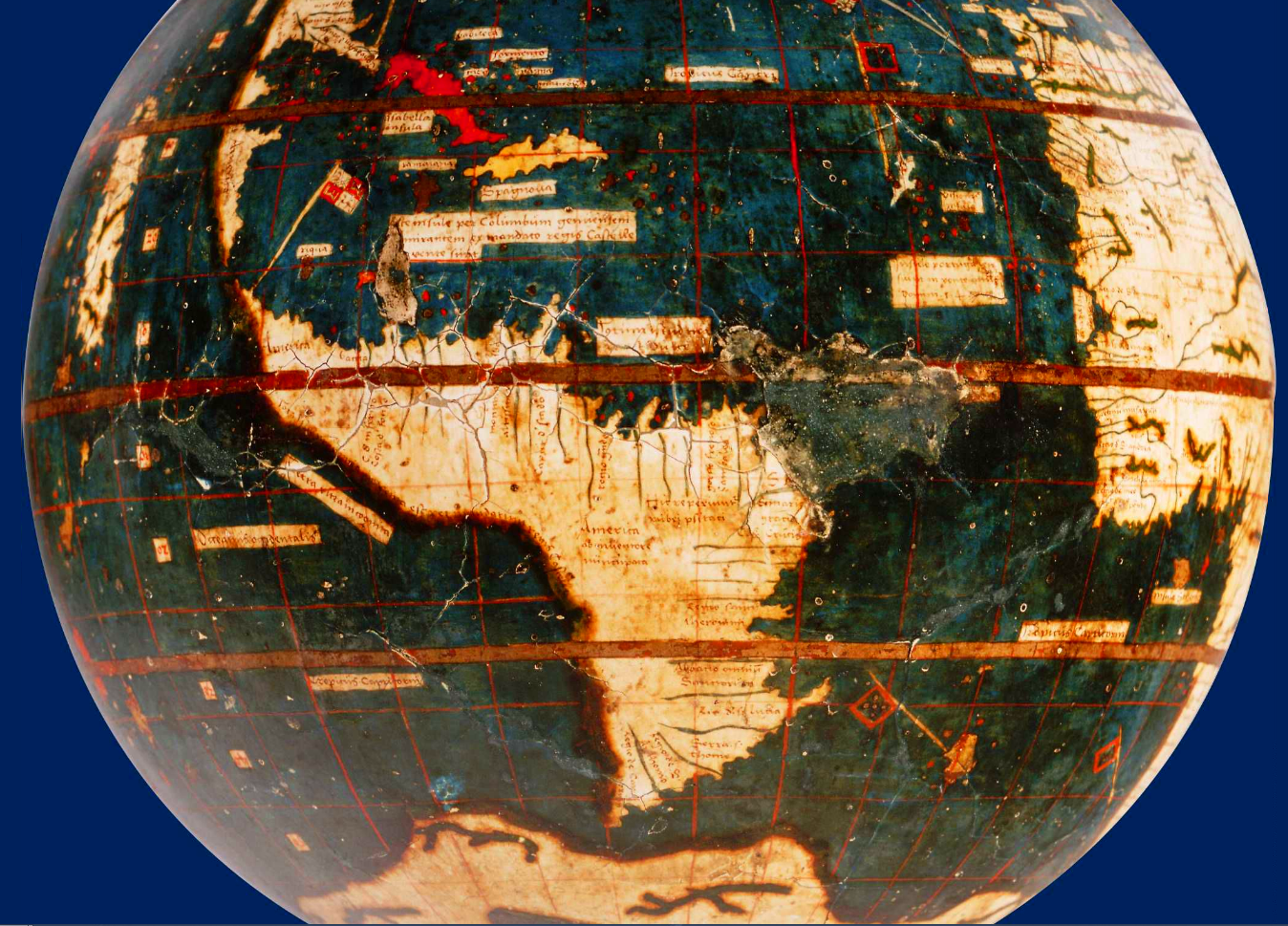
Globe vert America

America ab inventore nuncupata (America, called after its discoverer) on the Globe vert, c. 1507

== Amerigo Vespucci ==
Americus Vesputius was the Latinized version of the Italian explorer Amerigo Vespucci's name, the forename being an old Italianization (compare modern Italian Enrico) of Medieval Latin Emericus (see Saint Emeric of Hungary), from the Old High German name Emmerich, which may have been a merger of several Germanic names – Amalric, Ermanaric and Old High German Haimirich, from Proto-Germanic *amala- ('vigor, bravery'), *ermuna- ('great; whole') or *haima- ('home') + *rīk- ('ruler') (compare *Haimarīks).

Amerigo Vespucci (March 9, 1454 – February 22, 1512) was an Italian explorer, financier, navigator and cartographer who may have been the first to assert that the West Indies and corresponding mainland were not part of Asia's eastern outskirts as initially conjectured from Columbus's voyages, but instead constituted an entirely separate landmass hitherto unknown to the Europeans.

Vespucci was apparently unaware of the use of his name to refer to the new landmass, as Waldseemüller's maps did not reach Spain until a few years after his death. Ringmann may have been misled into crediting Vespucci by the widely published Soderini Letter, a sensationalized version of one of Vespucci's actual letters reporting on the mapping of the South American coast, which glamorized his discoveries and implied that he had recognized that South America was a continent separate from Asia. Spain officially refused to accept the name America for two centuries, saying that Columbus should get credit, and Waldseemüller's later maps, after Ringmann's death, did not include it; in 1513 he labelled it "Terra Incognita" with a note about Columbus's discovery of the land.

Following Waldseemüller, the Swiss scholar Heinrich Glarean included the name America in a 1528 work of geography published in Basel. There, four years later, the German scholar Simon Grinaeus published a map, which Hans Holbein and Sebastian Münster (who had made sketches of Waldseemüller's 1507 map) contributed to; this labelled the continent America Terra Nova (America, the New Land). In 1534, Joachim von Watt labelled it simply America. Gerardus Mercator applied the names North and South America on his influential 1538 world map; by this point, the naming was irrevocable. Acceptance may have been aided by the "natural poetic counterpart" that the name America made with Asia, Africa, and Europa.

== Nicaraguan mountain range ==
In 1874, Thomas Belt published the indigenous name "Amerrisque Mountains", a range in present-day Nicaragua. The next year, Jules Marcou suggested a derivation of the continent's name from this mountain range. Marcou corresponded with Augustus Le Plongeon, who wrote: "The name AMERICA or AMERRIQUE in the Mayan language means, a country of perpetually strong wind, or the Land of the Wind, and ... the [suffixes] can mean ... a spirit that breathes, life itself."

In this view, native speakers shared this indigenous word with Columbus and members of his crew, and Columbus made landfall in the vicinity of these mountains on his fourth voyage. The name America then spread via oral means throughout Europe relatively quickly even reaching Waldseemüller, who was preparing a map of newly reported lands for publication in 1507. Waldseemüller's work in the area of denomination takes on a different aspect in this view. Jonathan Cohen of Stony Brook University writes:

The baptismal passage in the Cosmographiae Introductio has commonly been read as argument, in which the author said that he was naming the newly discovered continent in honor of Vespucci and saw no reason for objections. But, as etymologist Joy Rea has suggested, it could also be read as an explanation, in which he indicates that he has heard the New World was called America, and the only explanation lay in Vespucci's name.

Among the reasons which proponents give in adopting this theory include the recognition of, in Cohen's words, "the simple fact that place names usually originate informally in the spoken word and first circulate that way, not in the printed word". In addition, Waldseemüller not only is exonerated from the charge of having arrogated to himself the privilege of naming lands, which privilege was reserved to monarchs and explorers, but also is freed from the charge of violating the long-established and virtually inviolable ancient European tradition of using only the first name of royal individuals as opposed to the last name of commoners (such as Vespucci) in bestowing names to lands.

== Richard Amerike ==
Bristol antiquarian Alfred Hudd suggested in 1908 that the name was derived from the surname "Amerike" or "ap Meryk" and was used on early British maps that have since been lost. Richard ap Meryk, anglicised to Richard Amerike, was a wealthy Anglo-Welsh merchant, royal customs officer and sheriff of Bristol. According to some writers, he was the principal owner of the Matthew, the ship sailed by John Cabot during his voyage of exploration to North America in 1497. The idea that Richard Amerike was a 'principal supporter' of Cabot has gained popular currency in the 21st century. There is no evidence to support this. Similarly, and contrary to a recent tradition that names Amerike as principal owner and main funder of the Matthew, Cabot's ship of 1497, academic enquiry does not connect Amerike with the ship. Her ownership at that date remains uncertain. Macdonald asserts that the caravel was specifically built for the Atlantic crossing.

Hudd proposed his theory in a paper which was read at the 21 May 1908 meeting of the Clifton Antiquarian Club, and which appeared in Volume 7 of the club's Proceedings. In "Richard Ameryk and the name America", Hudd discussed the 1497 discovery of North America by John Cabot, an Italian who had sailed on behalf of England. Upon his return to England after his first (1497) and second (1498–1499) voyages, Cabot received two pension payments from Henry VII. Of the two customs officials at the Port of Bristol who were responsible for delivering the money to Cabot, the more senior was Richard Ameryk (High Sheriff of Bristol in 1503). Hudd postulated that Cabot named the land that he had discovered after Ameryk, from whom he received the pension conferred by the king. He stated that Cabot had a reputation for being free with gifts to his friends, such that his expression of gratitude to the official would not be unexpected. Hudd also thought it unlikely that America would have been named after Vespucci's given name rather than his family name. Hudd used a quote from a late 15th-century manuscript (a calendar of Bristol events), the original of which had been lost in an 1860 Bristol fire, that indicated the name America was already known in Bristol in 1497.

This year (1497), on St. John the Baptist's day (June 24th), the land of America was found by the merchants of Bristow, in a ship of Bristowe called the 'Mathew,' the which said ship departed from the port of Bristowe the 2nd of May and came home again the 6th August following.

Hudd reasoned that the scholars of the 1507 Cosmographiae Introductio, unfamiliar with Richard Ameryk, assumed that the name America, which he claimed had been in use for ten years, was based on Amerigo Vespucci and, therefore, mistakenly transferred the honour from Ameryk to Vespucci. While Hudd's speculation has found support from some authors, there is no strong evidence to substantiate his theory that Cabot named America after Richard Ameryk.

Moreover, because Amerike's coat of arms was similar to the flag later adopted by the independent United States, a legend grew that the North American continent had been named for him rather than for Amerigo Vespucci. It is not widely accepted - the origin is usually attributed to the flag of the British East India Company.

== Native naming of the continent ==
In 1977, the World Council of Indigenous Peoples (Consejo Mundial de Pueblos Indígenas) proposed using the term Abya Yala instead of "America" when referring to the continent. There are also names in other indigenous languages such as Ixachitlan and Runa Pacha. Some scholars have adopted the term as an objection to colonialism.
