= Names of the United States =

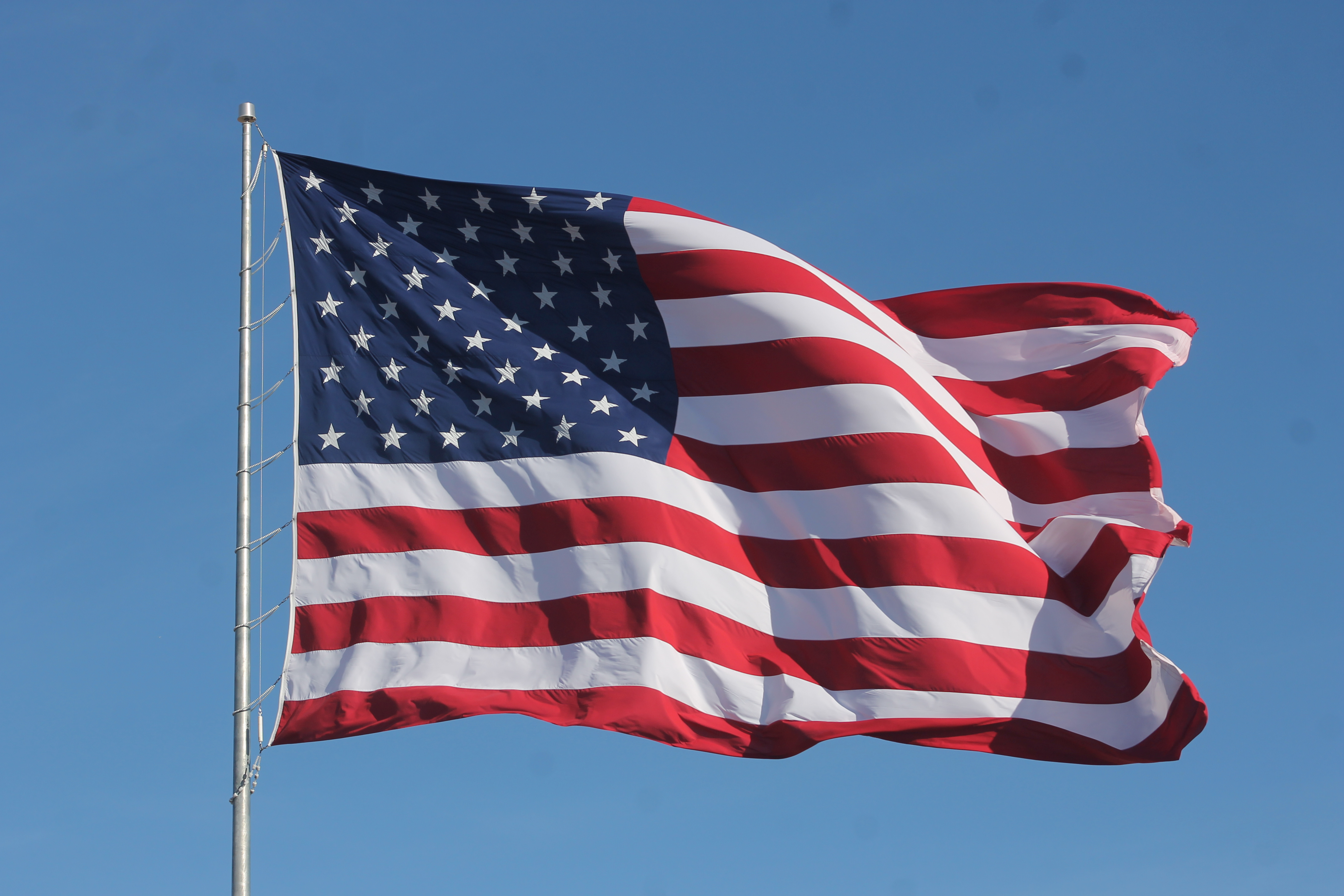
The American flag, a symbol of the United States of America

Several names of the United States of America are in common use. Alternatives to the full name include "the United States", "America", and the initialisms "the U.S." and "the U.S.A.".

It is generally accepted that the name "America" derives from the Italian explorer Amerigo Vespucci. The term dates back to 1507, when it appeared on a world map created by the German cartographer Martin Waldseemüller, in honor of Vespucci, applied to the land that is now Brazil. The full name "United States of America" was first used during the American Revolutionary War, though its precise origin is a matter of contention. The newly formed union was first known as the "United Colonies", and the earliest known usage of the modern full name dates from a January 2, 1776 letter written between two military officers. The Articles of Confederation, prepared by John Dickinson, and the Declaration of Independence, drafted by Thomas Jefferson, both contain the phrase "United States of America." The name was officially adopted by the second Continental Congress on September 9, 1776.

== Etymology ==
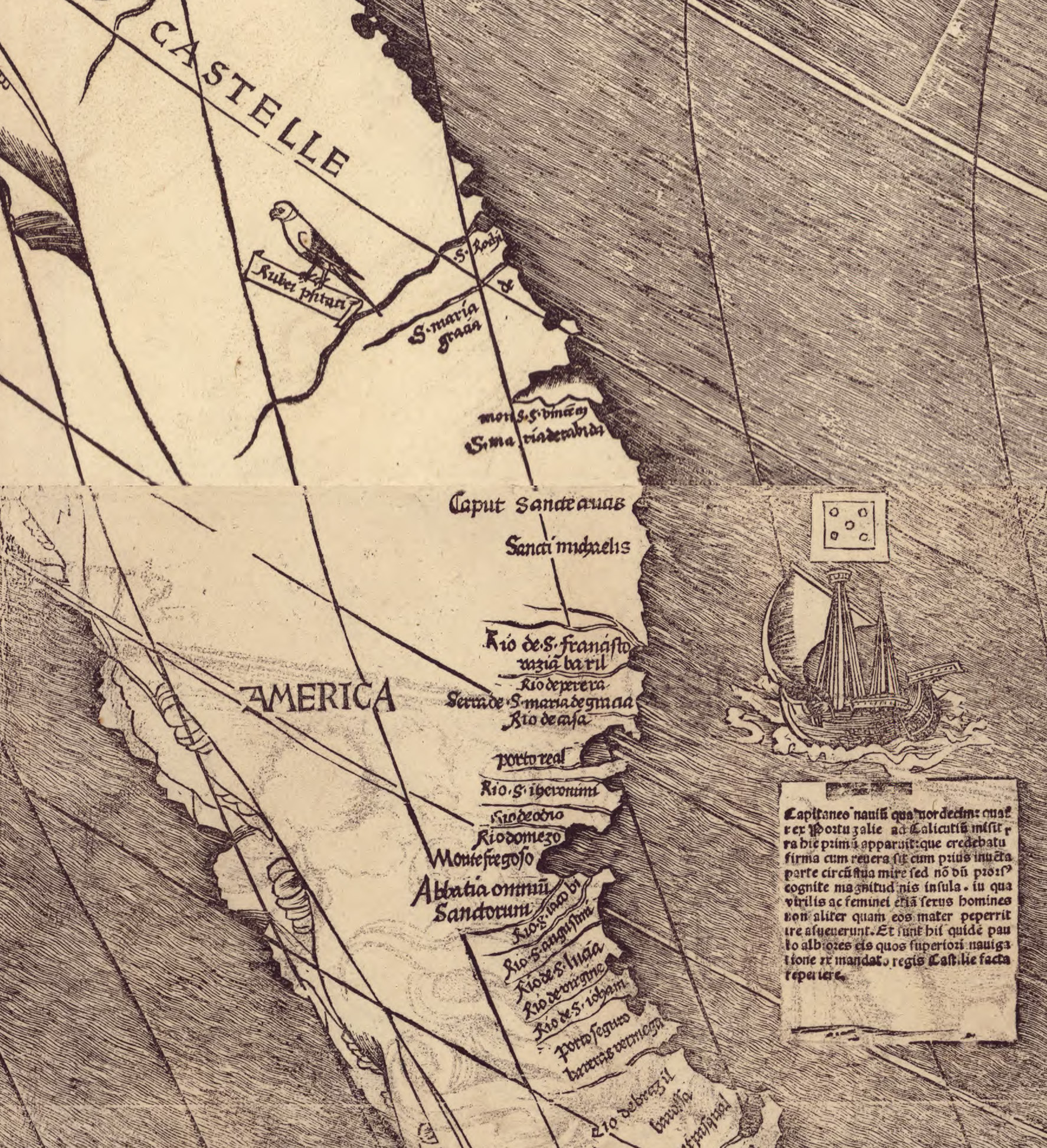
Waldseemüller map closeup showing the name "America" placed upon what is nowadays Brazil

=== America ===
The earliest known use of the name "America" dates to 1505, when German poet Matthias Ringmann used it in a poem about the New World. The word is a Latinized form of the first name of Italian explorer Amerigo Vespucci, who first proposed that the West Indies discovered by Christopher Columbus in 1492 were part of a previously unknown landmass, rather than the eastern limit of Asia. On April 25, 1507, the map Universalis Cosmographia, created by German cartographer Martin Waldseemüller, was published alongside this poem. The map uses the label "America" for what is now known as South America. In 1538, the Flemish cartographer Gerardus Mercator used the name "America" on his own world map, applying it to the entire Western Hemisphere.

Alternative theories suggest that "America" derives from the Amerrisque Mountains of Nicaragua, or from the surname of wealthy Anglo-Welsh merchant Richard Amerike.

=== United States of America ===
The first documentary evidence of the phrase "United States of America" dates from a January 2, 1776, letter written by Stephen Moylan, Esquire, to George Washington's aide-de-camp Joseph Reed. Moylan was fulfilling Reed's role during the latter's absence. Moylan expressed his wish to go "with full and ample powers from the United States of America to Spain" to seek assistance in the Revolutionary War effort. The first known publication of the phrase "United States of America" was in an anonymous essay in The Virginia Gazette newspaper in Williamsburg, Virginia, on April 6, 1776. It is commonly mistaken that Thomas Paine coined the term in his pamphlet Common Sense, published in January 1776, but he never used the final form. (Note: Paine used the terms "United Colonies", "American states", and "FREE AND INDEPENDENT STATES OF AMERICA", but never "United States of America".)

The second draft of the Articles of Confederation, prepared by John Dickinson and completed no later than June 17, 1776, declared "The name of this Confederation shall be the 'United States of America'." The final version of the Articles, sent to the states for ratification in late 1777, stated that "The Stile of this Confederacy shall be 'The United States of America'." In June 1776, Thomas Jefferson wrote "UNITED STATES OF AMERICA" in all capitalized letters in the headline of his "original Rough draught" (Note: "Draught" is the British spelling of "draft".) of the Declaration of Independence. This draft of the document did not surface until June 21, 1776, and it is unclear whether it was written before or after Dickinson used the term in his June 17 draft of the Articles of Confederation. In any case, the Declaration of Independence was the first official document to use the nation's new title.

== History ==
In the early days of the American Revolution, the colonies as a unit were most commonly referred to as the "United Colonies". For example, president of the Continental Congress Richard Henry Lee wrote in a June 7, 1776 resolution: "These United Colonies are, and of right, ought to be, free and independent States." Before 1776, names for the colonies varied significantly; they included "Twelve United English Colonies of North America", "United Colonies of North America", and others. On September 9, 1776, the Second Continental Congress officially changed the nation's name to the "United States of America".

In the first few years of the United States, however, there remained some discrepancies of usage. In the Treaty of Alliance (1778) with France, the term "United States of North America" was used. In accordance with this usage, when the Congress was drawing bills of exchange for French commissioners on May 19, 1778, they decided to use this term. President of the Continental Congress Henry Laurens even wrote that "Congress have adopted the Stile of the Treaties of Paris, 'the United States of North America'." Congress, however, reconsidered this change on July 11, 1778 and resolved to drop "North" from the bills of exchange, making them consistent with the name adopted in 1776.

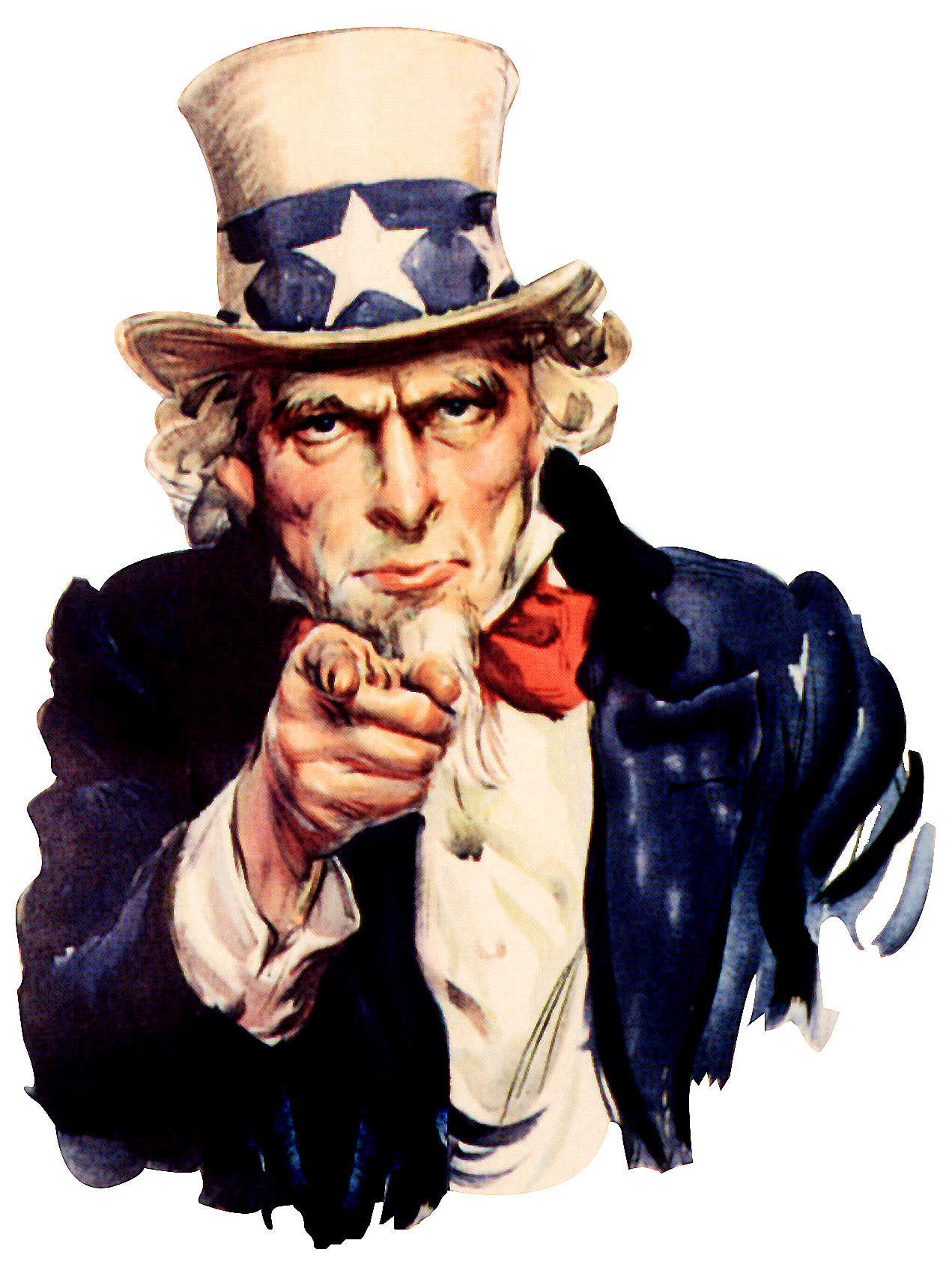
Propaganda artwork of Uncle Sam, the national personification of America; his name originated from the colloquial term U.S.

Since the Articles of Confederation, the concept of a Perpetual Union between the states has existed, and "Union" has become synonymous with "United States". This usage was especially prevalent during the Civil War, when it referred specifically to the loyalist northern states which remained part of the federal union.

The term "America" was less commonly used in the United States before the 1890s. Historian Daniel Immerwahr found that "one can search through all the messages and public papers of the presidents—including annual messages, inaugural addresses, proclamations, special messages to Congress, and much more—from the founding to 1898 and encounter only eleven unambiguous references to the country as America, about one per decade." This changed with Theodore Roosevelt, who "spoke of America in his first annual message and never looked back. In one two-week period, Roosevelt used the name more than all his predecessors combined had. Every president since has used America freely and frequently." The term "America" did not appear in patriotic songs composed during the eighteenth and most of the nineteenth centuries, including "The Star-Spangled Banner", "My Country, 'Tis of Thee", and the "Battle Hymn of the Republic"; it is used in "America the Beautiful" of 1895 and is common in twentieth-century songs like "God Bless America", written in 1918.

The name "Columbia", popular in American poetry and songs of the late eighteenth century, derives its origin from Christopher Columbus. Many landmarks and institutions in the Western Hemisphere bear his name, including the country of Colombia and the District of Columbia.

Circa 1810, the term Uncle Sam was "a cant term in the army for the United States," according to an 1810 edition Niles' Weekly Register. Uncle Sam is now known as a national personification of the United States.

=== Usage as a singular noun ===
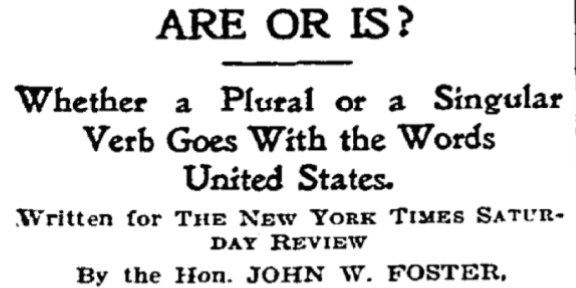
The headline of Foster's column

The phrase "United States" was originally plural, a description of a collection of independent states—e.g., "the United States are"—including in the Thirteenth Amendment to the United States Constitution, ratified in 1865. The singular form became popular after the end of the Civil War, and is now standard. (Note: G. H. Emerson, The Universalist Quarterly and General Review, Vol. 28 (January 1891), p. 49, quoted in) However, the plural form is retained in the idiom "these United States". The difference is more significant than usage; it is a difference between a collection of states and a unit.

The transition from plural to singular was gradual. In a May 4, 1901, column in the New York Times titled "ARE OR IS? Whether a Plural or Singular Verb Goes With the Words United States", former Secretary of State John W. Foster noted that early statesmen such as Alexander Hamilton and Daniel Webster had used the singular form, as well as the Treaty of Paris (1898) and Hay–Pauncefote Treaty of 1900; conversely, most Supreme Court decisions still used the plural form. He concludes that "since the civil war the tendency has been towards [singular] use." Mark Liberman of the University of Pennsylvania found that, in the corpus of Supreme Court opinions, the transition to singular usage occurred in the early 1900s. Among English-language books, the transition happened earlier, around 1880.

== Usage ==
The name "United States" is unambiguous; "United States of America" may be used in titles or when extra formality is desired. However, "United States" and "U.S." may be used adjectivally, while the full name cannot. English usage of "America" rarely refers to topics unrelated to the United States, despite the usage of "Americas" as the totality of North and South America. "The States" is an established colloquial shortening of the name, used particularly from abroad. A jocular and sometimes derogatory name is alternatively spelled "Merica" or "Murica".

The official U.S. Government Publishing Office Style Manual prescribes specific usages for "U.S." and "United States". In treaties, congressional bills, etc., (Note: The full list is: "formal writing (treaties, Executive orders, proclamations, etc.); congressional bills; legal citations and courtwork; and covers and title pages.") "United States" is always used. In a sentence containing the name of another country, "United States" must be used. Otherwise, "U.S." is used preceding a government organization or as an adjective, but "United States" is used as an adjective preceding non-governmental organizations (e.g. United States Steel Corporation).

Style guides conflict over how various names for the United States should be used. The Chicago Manual of Style, until the 17th edition, required "US" and "U.S." to be used as an adjective; it now permits the usage of both as a noun, though "United States" is still preferred in this case. The Associated Press Stylebook permits the usage of "US" and "U.S." as both adjectives and nouns, though "US" (without the periods) is only allowed in headlines. APA Style, in contrast, only allows "U.S." to be used as an adjective, and disallows "US".

== Other languages ==
=== Names in the European cultural sphere ===
In Spanish, the United States of America is known as Estados Unidos de América (abbreviated EE. UU. or EUA) and commonly known as Estados Unidos (United States). The Americas are known simply as América. Spanish uses estadounidense or estadunidense and less commonly, norteamericano (North American) for the adjectival form. Americano is sometimes used, but more often refers to anyone or anything from the Americas. Other Romance languages like French (translated États-Unis d'Amérique), Portuguese (Estados Unidos da América, abbreviated as EUA), Italian (Stati Uniti d'America) or Romanian (Statele Unite ale Americii) follow a similar pattern, but in European Portuguese, the word América can refer both to the continent of the Americas and to the country. In Brazilian Portuguese, América only refers to the continent of the Americas. In German, the country's name is translated to Vereinigte Staaten von Amerika and in Dutch to Verenigde Staten van Amerika. In Esperanto, the United States is known as Usono, with the adjective form for American being Usona. These constructions borrow the first letters of the English words United States of North America, while changing the final a to an o for the noun form in conformance with the rules of Esperanto grammar.

=== Names in the Asian cultural sphere ===
The U.S. flag was brought to the city of Canton (Guǎngzhōu) in China in 1784 by the merchant ship Empress of China, which carried a cargo of ginseng. There it gained the designation "Flower Flag" (Chinese: 花旗; pinyin: huāqí; Cantonese Yale: fākeì). According to a pseudonymous account first published in the Boston Courier and later retold by author and U.S. naval officer George H. Preble:

When the thirteen stripes and stars first appeared at Canton, much curiosity was excited among the people. News was circulated that a strange ship had arrived from the further end of the world, bearing a flag "as beautiful as a flower". Every body went to see the kwa kee chuen [花旗船; Fākeìsyùhn], or "flower flagship". This name at once established itself in the language, and America is now called the kwa kee kwoh [花旗國; Fākeìgwok], the "flower flag country"—and an American, kwa kee kwoh yin [花旗國人; Fākeìgwokyàhn]—"flower flag countryman"—a more complimentary designation than that of "red headed barbarian"—the name first bestowed upon the Dutch.

The names given were common usage in the nineteenth and early twentieth centuries.

The modern standard Chinese name for the United States is Měiguó from Mandarin (美国; 美國, with the first character měi literally meaning 'beautiful'). This is an abbreviated form of the full name Měilìjiān Hézhòngguó (美利坚合众国; 美利堅合眾國). Hézhòngguó was a coinage, probably by Elijah Coleman Bridgman around 1844, which attempted to convey the idea of "many states" (zhòngguó) which are "united" (hé), but due to rebracketing this term became more commonly understood as a "country" (guó) comprising a "union of many" (hézhòng). Měilìjiān is a transcription into Chinese characters of "American", which survives in modern Chinese usage alongside Yàměilìjiā (亚美利加; 亞美利加, "America"). In the 19th century, there were also several other transcriptions using mò (黙 'silence', 墨 'ink') or mí (彌 'full') to represent the second syllable of "America", but these fell out of usage. The Americas are known as Měizhōu (Chinese: 美洲), with Měi having the same etymology as in Měiguó. These names are unrelated to the flag. However, the "flower flag" terminology persists in some places today: for example, American ginseng is called flower flag ginseng (花旗参; 花旗參) in Chinese, and Citibank, which opened a branch in China in 1902, is known as Flower Flag Bank (花旗银行).

Similarly, Vietnamese also uses the borrowed term from Chinese with Sino-Vietnamese reading for the United States, as Hoa Kỳ from 花旗 ("Flower Flag"). Even though the United States is also called nước Mỹ (or simpler Mỹ) colloquially in Vietnamese before the name Měiguó was popular amongst Chinese, Hoa Kỳ is always recognized as the formal name for the United States with the Vietnamese state officially designates it as Hợp chúng quốc Hoa Kỳ (chữ Hán: 合眾國 花旗, lit. 'United states of the Flower Flag'). By that, in Vietnam, the U.S. is also nicknamed xứ Cờ Hoa ("land of Flower Flag") based on the Hoa Kỳ designation.

In Japanese, the U.S. is known as Amerika (アメリカ) in speech or sometimes as Beikoku (米国) in formal writing. In the formal long name Amerika Gasshūkoku (アメリカ合衆国), the term Gasshūkoku was borrowed from Chinese Hézhòngguó; this replaced other translations of "United States" such as Mitsukuri Shōgo's Kyōwaseijishū (共和政治州, "states with republican government"). Historically, Japanese had used a different kanji transcription for "America" (亞墨利加, with the second character 墨 meaning 'ink'), following the 17th-century Kunyu Wanguo Quantu map. This transcription continued to be used throughout the 18th and 19th centuries (e.g. in Arai Hakuseki's 1715 Seiyō Kibun). Mitsukuri used both this and a different transcription (米里堅, using the character 米 'uncooked rice'), the latter following the usage in Robert Morrison's 1822 Chinese–English dictionary. A transcription using the character 'uncooked rice' was also used in the Japanese version of the 1853 Japan–US Treaty of Peace and Amity, and thereafter that first character was adopted to form the short name of the US in formal writing. Japanese works, unlike those in neighboring countries, never adopted any of the transcriptions containing the character 'beautiful' (美).

In Korean, the U.S. is known as Miguk (Korean: 미국; Hanja: 美國), which has been suggested as the etymology for the ethnic slur gook. In Burmese, the U.S. is known as အမေရိကန်ပြည်ထောင်စု (amerikan pyedaungsu), literally "American Union." In Hindi, the U.S. is translated to अमेरिका के संयुक्त राज्य (amērikā kē saṁyukta rājya). In Kannada, the U.S. is known as ಅಮೆರಿಕದ ಸಂಯುಕ್ತ ಸಂಸ್ಥಾನ (amerikada saṁyukta saṁsthāna), literally "America's Union of States".

== See also ==
- American (word)
- Demonyms for the United States
- List of countries that include United States in their name

== Notes ==
By ISO 639-3 code
Enter an ISO code to find the corresponding language article.
