= Introductio =

Introductio can refer to:

- Introductio in analysin infinitorum, a book on Mathematics by Leonhard Euler
- Cosmographiae Introductio, a book on Geography by an unknown author
