= Alfred Hudd =

English naturalist and antiquarian

Alfred Edmund Hudd
- Born: 1846; Clifton, Bristol, England
- Died: 7 October 1920; Clifton, Bristol, England
- Occupations: Accountant; Naturalist; Antiquarian
- Known for: "Catalogue of the Lepidoptera of the Bristol District"; Proceedings of the Clifton Antiquarian Club; Caerwent Exploration Fund "Richard Ameryk and the name America"

Alfred Edmund Hudd FSA (1846 – 7 October 1920) was a native of Clifton, Bristol, England. An accountant as a young man, his means were such that he was able to pursue his interests as a naturalist and antiquarian. He was a member of a number of societies, often assuming leadership positions. Hudd is perhaps best known for his roles as author of Catalogue of the Lepidoptera of the Bristol District, editor of the Proceedings of the Clifton Antiquarian Club, supervisor of the excavations undertaken by the Caerwent Exploration Fund, and author of "Richard Ameryk and the name America."

== Background ==
Alfred Edmund Hudd, son of leather merchant Samuel Hudd and his wife Mary Ann, was born in the second quarter of 1846 in Clifton. An accountant, he married Catharine Bowles Edmonds in the first quarter of 1872, their marriage recorded in the registration district of Faringdon, Berkshire. In 1881, Alfred and his wife resided at Clinton House on Pembroke Road in Clifton.

== Naturalist ==
By 1870, Hudd was a member of the Bristol Naturalists' Society, which had been founded in 1862. He was first appointed to the Council of the society on 6 May 1875, and remained a member of the Council for years, until about 1892. After a hiatus as a Council member for several years, Hudd was reappointed to the Council in 1899, where he remained until at least 1901. He specialised in entomology. His Catalogue of the Lepidoptera of the Bristol District was published in six parts in the Proceedings of the Bristol Naturalists' Society:

- Parts I and 2 appeared in Volume 2 of the Proceedings of the Bristol Naturalists' Society, published in 1879.
- Parts 3, 4, and 5 appeared in Volume 3 of the Proceedings of the Bristol Naturalists' Society, published in 1882.
- Part 6 appeared in Volume 4 of the Proceedings of the Bristol Naturalists' Society, published in 1885.

Hudd was also a Fellow of the Entomological Society of London, founded in 1833, and now known as the Royal Entomological Society of London. In 1912, he presented his collection of 1300 coleoptera (beetle) specimens to the Bristol Museum and Library, now the Bristol City Museum and Art Gallery, to supplement the Stephen Barton (d. 1898) collection. His collection of lepidoptera (butterflies and moths) specimens was added to the George C. Griffiths (1852–1924) collection at the Bristol Museum. Hudd also contributed a short chapter on "The Insects of the Bristol District" to the Handbook to Bristol and the neighbourhood.

== Antiquarian ==
Hudd was elected secretary of the Clifton Antiquarian Club at its first meeting on 23 January 1884 at the Bristol Museum and Library. He retained that position during all twenty-eight years of the original society. Not only a founding member of the club, Alfred Edmund Hudd had the distinction of being the only member of the Clifton Antiquarian Club to remain with the original organisation from its inception in 1884 to its end in 1912. He served as editor of the society's seven volumes of Proceedings, also contributing 21 papers. His service to the organisation was acknowledged on 5 January 1898 when the club presented him with a silver bowl and a set of four silver candlesticks. In 1911, the membership of the club again paid tribute to his efforts, with an inscribed, inlaid grandfather clock.

Alfred Hudd was a member of the Bristol and Gloucestershire Archaeological Society, and served on its Council. On 9 August 1904, he was elected to membership of the Royal Society of Antiquaries of Ireland at a meeting of that organisation held at Tuam, County Galway. In addition, he was a Fellow of the Society of Antiquaries of London.

== Caerwent Exploration Fund ==
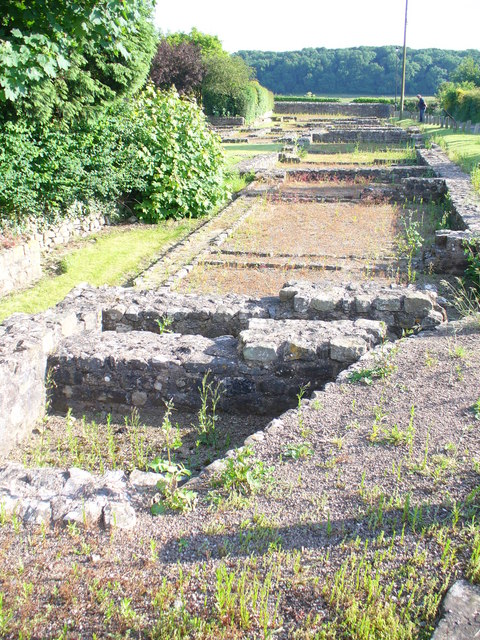
Excavations at Caerwent in south Wales

Alfred Hudd was closely involved with the Caerwent Exploration Fund. At a meeting of the Society of Antiquaries of London in February 1899, Alfred Trice Martin, also a founding member of the Clifton Antiquarian Club and a Fellow of the Society of Antiquaries of London, suggested that a systematic excavation of Caerwent, a Roman town in south Wales, be undertaken. The Caerwent Exploration Fund was established by the Clifton Antiquarian Club soon thereafter. In September 1899, at Caerwent, Godfrey Morgan, Lord Tredegar, was elected President of the Caerwent Exploration Fund and Alfred Hudd was elected Treasurer. Hudd and Thomas Ashby, Junior, both members of the Executive Committee of the Fund, supervised the excavations at Caerwent. During the period between 1899 and 1913, two-thirds of the Roman town in south Wales was revealed. The archive of Caerwent, which was discovered during the excavations by the Fund, is in the archaeology collection of Newport Museum. The reports on the excavations at Caerwent were published in Archaeologia, the journal of the Society of Antiquaries of London. Much of the success of the Caerwent Exploration Fund has been attributed to Alfred Hudd.

== The naming of America ==
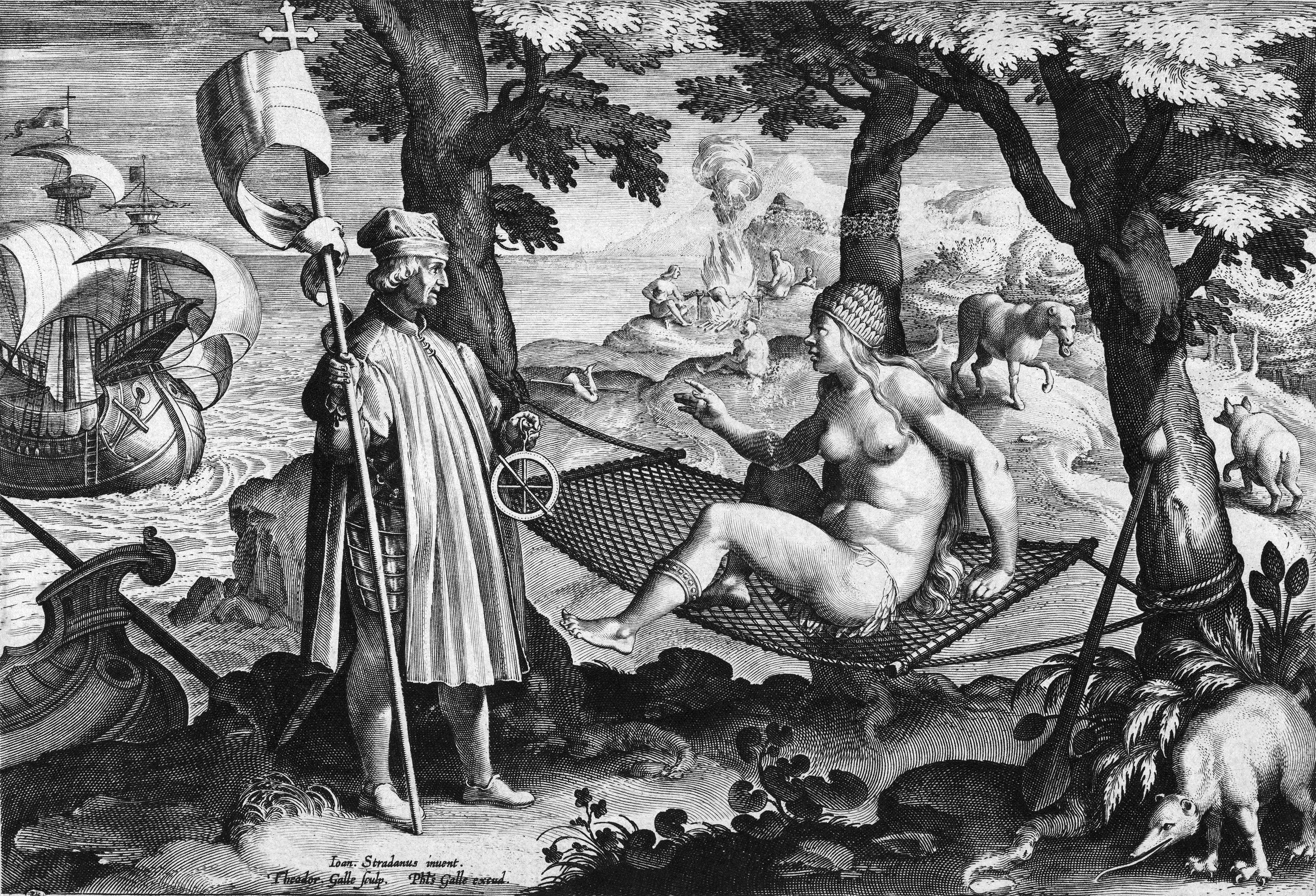
America by Johannes Stradanus (1523–1605). "Americus rediscovers America. He called her but once and thenceforth she was always awake."

The traditional theory of the naming of America is that it was named in honour of Amerigo Vespucci, an Italian navigator. At the turn of the sixteenth century, Vespucci undertook a series of voyages (the number of which remains unresolved) in search of a western passage to the Indies. After the voyage of 1501–1502, he proposed that the areas that he and, separately, Christopher Columbus had explored were not part of Asia, but rather a New World. America first received its name in the Cosmographiae Introductio, published by cartographer Martin Waldseemüller in 1507. Vespucci's published letters (the authenticity of which is contested) were the inspiration for that work, which was authored by a group of scholars in Saint-Dié, Lorraine, France. They revised Ptolemy's Geography to include the New World and reasoned that, as the three previously known continents, Europe, Asia, and Africa, had feminine names, so should the New World. Accordingly, the feminised version of the Latin form of the baptismal name of the "discoverer" of the New World, Vespucci, was utilised. The appendix of the book included Waldseemüller's map of the world in which the New World was labelled "America." The map, rediscovered in a German castle in 1901, was the first to use the name America and the first to depict a Western Hemisphere. The Library of Congress purchased the 1507 Waldseemüller map in 2003. On 30 April 2007, German Chancellor Angela Merkel transferred the map, also known as America's "birth certificate," to the people of the United States in a ceremony at the Library of Congress.

There are several alternate theories of the naming of America. Alfred Hudd proposed his theory in a paper which was read at 21 May 1908 meeting of the Clifton Antiquarian Club, and which appeared in Volume 7 of the club's Proceedings. In "Richard Ameryk and the name America," Hudd discussed the 1497 discovery of North America by John Cabot, an Italian who had sailed on behalf of England. Upon his return to England after his first (1497) and second (1498–1499) voyages, Cabot received two pension payments from King Henry VII. Of the two customs officials at the Port of Bristol who were responsible for handing over the money to Cabot, the more senior was Richard Ameryk (High Sheriff of Bristol in 1503). Hudd postulated that Cabot named the land that he had discovered after Ameryk, from whom he received the pension conferred by the king. He stated that Cabot had a reputation for being free with gifts to his friends, such that his expression of gratitude to the official would not be unexpected. Further, Hudd quoted a late 15th-century manuscript (a calendar of Bristol events), the original of which had been lost in an 1860 Bristol fire, that indicated the name America was already known in Bristol in 1497.

This year (1497), on St. John the Baptist's day (June 24th), the land of America was found by the merchants of Bristow, in a ship of Bristowe called the 'Mathew,' the which said ship departed from the port of Bristowe the 2nd of May and came home again the 6th August following.

Hudd reasoned that the scholars of the 1507 Cosmographiae Introductio, unfamiliar with Richard Ameryk, assumed that the name America, which he claimed had been in use for ten years, was based on Amerigo Vespucci and, therefore, mistakenly transferred the honour from Ameryk to Vespucci. While Hudd's speculation has found support from more than one 21st century author, there is no hard proof to substantiate his theory that Cabot named America after Richard Ameryk.

== Later life ==
Hudd's first wife Kate died on 4 April 1889 and was buried in the Old Protestant Cemetery in Naples, Italy. Hudd married Adeline Sophia Tyzack in the fourth quarter of 1891 in the registration district of Kensington, London. In 1901, he resided at 94 Pembroke Road in Clifton with his second wife Adeline and two daughters. Alfred Edmund Hudd of 108 Pembroke Road in Clifton died on 7 October 1920, his death registered in Bristol in the fourth quarter of the year. His estate of almost £16,000 went to probate on 17 December 1920. His wife survived him.

== Archives ==
An archaeological notebook kept by Alfred Edmund Hudd is held at Bristol Archives (Ref. 13847/79).
