= Donato Grima =

Argentine artist (born 1949)

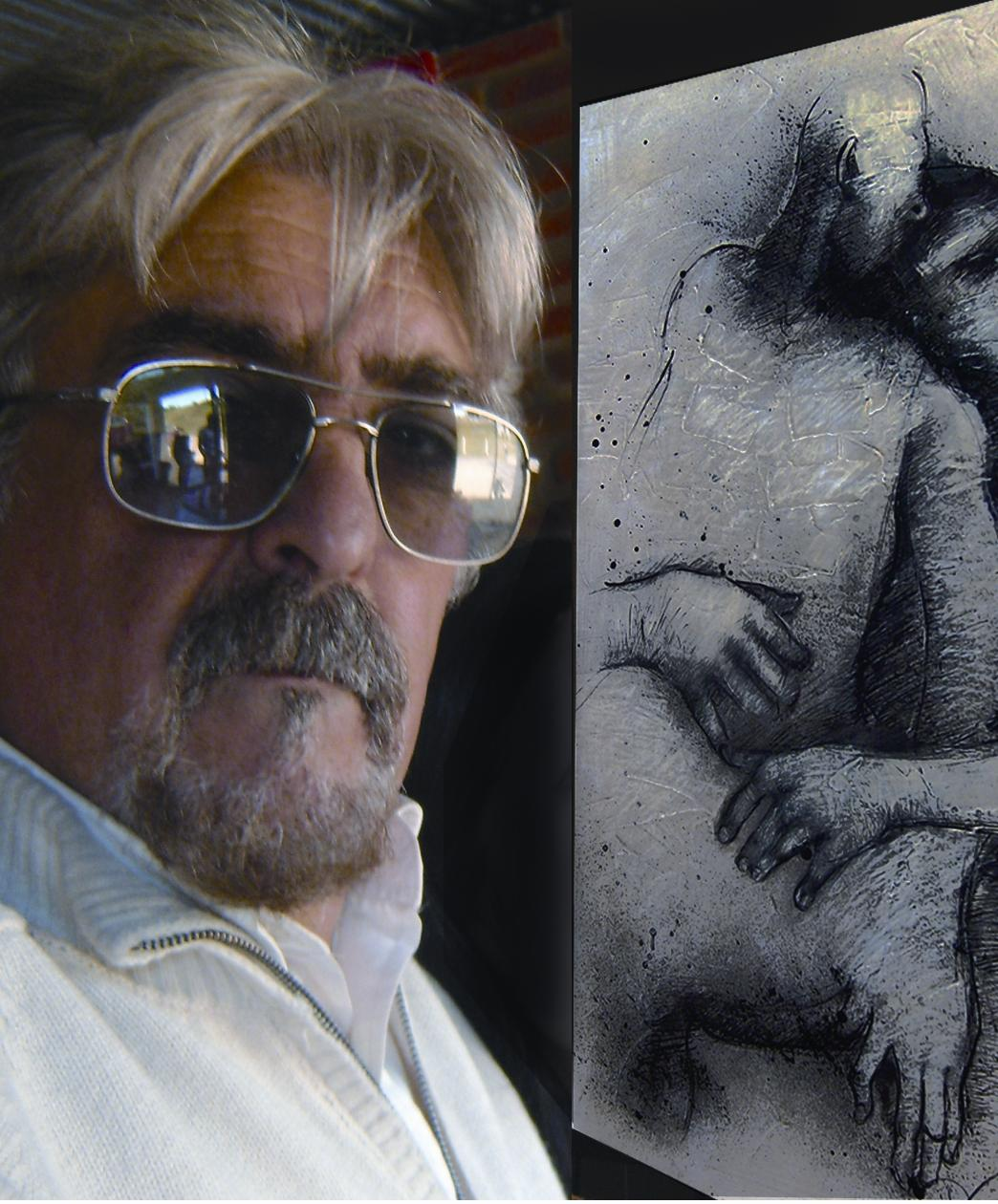
- Donato Grima, Buenos Aires, 2011
- Born: July 22, 1949 (age 76); Tucuman, Argentina
- Known for: Painting, Drawing, Visual arts, Digital art
- Movement: Contemporary art

Donato Grima (born July 22, 1949, in San Miguel de Tucumán) is an Argentine visual artist. He studied arts and design. During the 1970s, he moved to Caracas, Venezuela. He did not return to his home country until the mid 1980s, together with the restoration of democracy. From the 1990s until 2001 he lived in Spain. His painting The Patriarchs is in the collection of the Museo del Barrio of New York City. Other museums and private collections in several countries in Latin America and Europe bought part of his work. By 1993 he founded, in Argentina, The Center of Art & Design, institution devoted to the education in art and design. In 2009 he created his art gallery Art Territory in Tucumán.

== Awards ==
Among his numerous awards, the following can be highlighted:

- City of Santa Fe Prize, National Hall of Santa Fe, Argentina, 1988.
- First Prize Poem Illustrated Regional Hall (poem by Jose Augusto Moreno), Museum of Fine Arts, Tucumán, Argentina, 1988.
- Honorable Mention Award National Drawing Exhibition, Museum of Fine Arts, Tucumán, 1987.
- First Prize 50th Salon Nacional de Rosario, Argentina. 1986.
- First Prize Poem Illustrated Regional Hall (poem by Alberto Rojas Paz), 1972.
- Second Prize San Pablo Museum of Fine Arts, Tucumán, Argentina, 1972.

== His work in museums and collections ==
- Museo del Barrio, New York City EE.UU.
- Castagnino Museum, Rosario, Argentina.
- Museo Provincial Rosa Galisteo de Rodríguez, Santa Fe, Argentina
- Museo Provincial de Bellas Artes Timoteo Navarro, Tucumán, Argentina
- Museo Provincial de Bellas Artes de Salta, Salta, Argentina.
- Robert Bosh Collection, Madrid, Spain
- Benito Moreno Rojo Collection, Madrid, Spain
- Rudiger Wolf Collection, Hamburg, Germany

among other collections of Venezuela, Colombia, Brazil and Italy

== Published books ==
- "Donato Grima / Antologia de Obras" 2016
- Donato Grima / visual work, Madrid: Ediciones Infantas, 1991.
- Cristina Bulacio and Donato Grima, Dos Visiones sobre Borges, Buenos Aires: Ediciones Gaglianone, 1998.
- Roberto Espinosa, Donato Grima, Silvando Cielos”, Tucumán: Donato Grima, Digital Editions, 2009.

== Exhibitions ==
=== Individual international exhibitions ===
  - 2014, Museum of Fine Arts, Tlaxcala, Mexico.
  - 1998, Infantas Gallery, Madrid, Spain.
  - 1997, Carib Art Gallery, New York City, United States.
  - 1994, String Studio, New York City, United States.
  - 1994, Carib Art Gallery, New York City, United States.
  - 1994, Casino de Costa Blanca Villajoyosa, Spain.
  - 1991, Infantas Gallery, Madrid, Spain.
  - 1991, Geshe Gallery Mundt, Hamburg, Germany.
  - 1978, Imaginary Gallery Bogotá, Colombia.
  - 1977, Ochre Gallery, Caracas, Venezuela.
  - 1976, Ochre Gallery, Caracas, Venezuela.

=== Individual exhibitions in Argentina ===
  - 2013, Museum of Fine Arts Timoteo Navarro Tucumán.
  - 2011, University of Jose C. Paz Buenos Aires.
  - 2011, Gallery Palermo H Buenos Aires.
  - 2008, Museum of Contemporary Art (MAC) Salta.
  - 2007, Museum of Fine Arts, Salta.
  - 2006, Museum of Bellas Artes Timoteo Navarro Tucumán.
  - 2004, Cultural Center, National University of Tucumán .
  - 2001, Cultural Center, National University of Tucumán .
  - 1998, Centro Cultural Borges, Buenos Aires.
  - 1997, Cultural Center, National University of Tucumán .
  - 1995, Cultural Center, National University of Tucumán .
  - 1992, Cultural Center, National University of Tucumán .
  - 1990, Gallery Gloria Aleman Salta.
  - 1989, Gallery High Level, Buenos Aires.
  - 1988, Museum Octavio de la Colina, La Rioja.
  - 1981, Museum of Modern Art, Mendoza.
  - 1980, Ministry of Tourism, Tucumán.
  - 1972, Austral Hall, Tucumán.
  - 1972, Casa d'Italia, Paraná.
  - 1971, Gallery "Z" Tucumán.
