= Waldseemüller Rock =

Rock in Antarctica

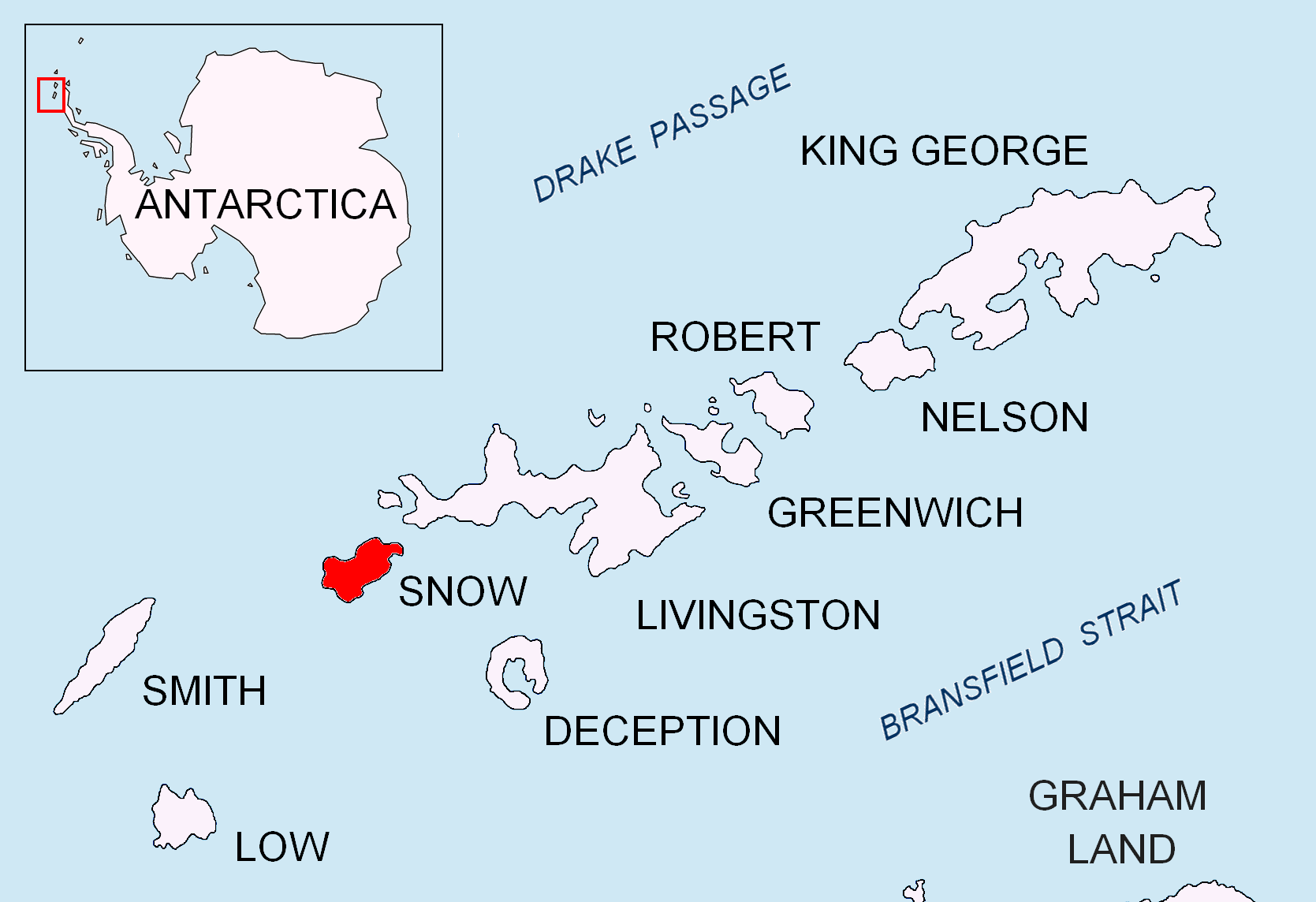
- Location of Snow Island in the South Shetland Islands

- Location within Antarctica Location within South Shetland Islands

Geography
- Location: Antarctica
- Coordinates: 62°51′52″S 61°26′31″W
- Archipelago: South Shetland Islands
- Area: 0.48 ha (1.2 acres)
- Length: 136 m (446 ft)
- Width: 53 m (174 ft)

Administration
- Administered under the Antarctic Treaty

Demographics
- Population: uninhabited

Topographic map of Livingston, Greenwich, Robert, Snow and Smith Islands

Waldseemüller Rock (Bulgarian: скала Валдзеемюлер, romanized: skala Waldseemüller, IPA: [skɐˈla ˈvaldzɛɛmʲulɛr]) is the rock off the south extremity of Snow Island in the South Shetland Islands, Antarctica; it is 136 m long in the west-east direction and 53 m wide, with a surface area of 0.48 ha. The vicinity was visited by early 19th-century sealers.

The feature is named after Martin Waldseemüller (circa 1470-1520), a German cartographer and topographer who created an early forerunner of the theodolite, in association with other names in the area deriving from the early development or use of geodetic instruments and methods.

== Location ==
Waldseemüller Rock is located at 62°51′52″S 61°26′31″W, which is 2.5 km south by west of Cape Conway and 930 m southwest of Tooth Rock, based on Bulgarian mapping in 2009.

== See also ==
- List of Antarctic and subantarctic islands

== Maps ==
- South Shetland Islands. Scale 1:200000 topographic map. DOS 610 Sheet W 62 60. Tolworth, UK, 1968
- L. Ivanov. Antarctica: Livingston Island and Greenwich, Robert, Snow and Smith Islands. Scale 1:120000 topographic map. Troyan: Manfred Wörner Foundation, 2010. ISBN 978-954-92032-9-5 (First edition 2009. ISBN 978-954-92032-6-4)
- Antarctic Digital Database (ADD). Scale 1:250000 topographic map of Antarctica. Scientific Committee on Antarctic Research (SCAR). Since 1993, regularly upgraded and updated
