= Meurig =

Meurig is a Welsh name of Brittonic origin and may refer to:

- Meurig ap Tewdrig (fl. before 470, the son of Tewdrig (St. Tewdrig), and a king of the early Welsh kingdoms of Gwent and Glywysing
- Meurig ap Idnerth, king of Buellt, a Welsh kingdom from c. 510 to 545
- Meurig (bishop) (died 1161), Welsh cleric, Bishop of Bangor from 1139 to 1161
- Meurig Dafydd (c. 1510–95), Welsh bard
- Meurig Bowen (born 1965), artistic director of the Cheltenham Music Festival
- Meurig Prysor, the bardic name of priest and university educator Maurice Jones

== See also ==
- Ystrad Meurig (or Ystradmeurig) is a village in Ceredigion, Wales
