= Amerrisque Mountains =

Mountain range in Nicaragua

Coordinates: 12°12′N 85°19′W

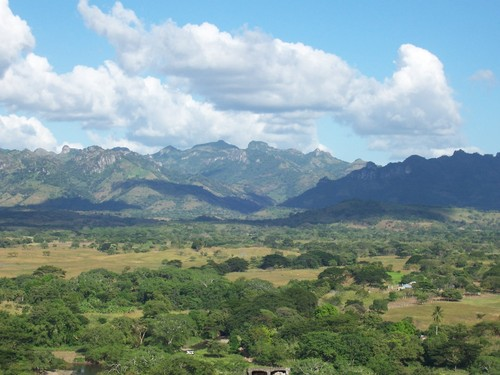
The range in 2016

The Amerrisque Mountains (Spanish: Serranías de Amerrisque, Cordillera de Amerrisque) are the central spine of Nicaragua and part of the Central American Range which extends throughout central Nicaragua for about 700 km (430 mi) from Honduras in the northwest to Costa Rica in the southwest, just a few miles from the Caribbean. The Amerrisques also are known as Cordillera Chontaleña at their central range. Its coordinates are 12°12'0" N and 85°19'0" W in DMS (degrees minutes seconds) or 12.2 and -85.3167 (in decimal degrees) and is 329 meters above sea level.

Amerrique is the Mayan name of the mountains between Juigalpa and Libertad in the Chontales Department in Nicaragua; these mountains separate Lake Nicaragua from the Mosquito Coast. The Mayan name Amerrique signifies "the country of the wind", "the country where the wind blows constantly". The range is named after the Amerrisque tribe, who are fast fading away. It is supposed that the Amerrisques were once powerful, but very little is known concerning them. The decay of their speech went on for a long time before contact with Europeans, and the name by which the people and the mountains are now known is, not improbably, the bare remnant of the original word, which may very well have been something like Amerristiquiqque, shortened successively to Amerristique and Amerrisque.

As Nicaragua's divide, the Amerrisques contain some high peaks such as Pataste (1736 m) in Madriz Region, Quiabuc (1604 m) in Estelí Region, and Chagüite (1345 m) in Matagalpa Region. At the same time, they are the source of many rivers such as the Segovia (775 km), the Siquia-Escondido (207 km), while crisscrossed by rivers born at other ranges such as the Grande (500 km), the Viejo (209 km), etc. The range also separates the Great Lakes Xolotlán and Cocibolca in Western Nicaragua, from the Mosquito Coast in Eastern Nicaragua.

The Amerrisques boast a rich flora, due to their latitude and altitude, which ranges from sub-alpine, by Honduras, to tropical, by Costa Rica. Species range from unique regionals such as madroño, espavel, and chilamate to North American species such as pine, oak, sweetgum, and terebinth, and South Americans such as gumtree, mahogany, and rosewood.

The fauna includes mountain lions, coyotes, ocelots; deer, guatusas, tapirs; anteaters, armadillos, quetzals; guardabarrancos, toucans, harpy eagles; great owls, roadrunners, rattlesnakes; coral snakes, fer-de-lance, and more. While the northern parts of the range are covered with pine or oak forests, the central regions feature dry to rainy forests and areas used for cattle ranching. The southern heights are covered in thick jungles along the San Juan River.

Some important cities located at the feet of the Amerrisques include Estelí (210,000), a cultural and manufacturing center, and Juigalpa (110,000), a cattle ranching area.

== Origin of the name America ==
In Tradiciones peruanas (1872), the Peruvian writer Ricardo Palma mentioned his belief that the etymology of America derived from the mountains of Amerrique. Without citing the source from which he obtained the information, he affirmed that "the name America circulated by oral tradition among the men of Columbus."

The English geologist and naturalist Thomas Belt, in his book The Naturalist in Nicaragua (1874), also suggested that the etymology of America came from the Amerrisque range.

The French-American geologist Jules Marcou, in his work Nouvelles Recherches sur l'Origine du Nom d'Amérique (first published: Paris, 1875), accepted and supported the thesis on the origin of the name America by Belt, who had served as engineer to the Compañía Minera de Chontales between 1868 and 1871 in the gold deposits of Santo Domingo, San Benito, and San Antonio.

The Enciclopedia universal ilustrada europeo-americana (Barcelona, 1907), volume 38, page 537, suggests that Columbus may have heard the name Amerrisque from the Rama people, who lived near the present-day Bluefields (in Rama Cay), and who had probably originated farther up the Escondido River, perhaps at its sources in Amerrisque.

The Nicaraguan archaeologist Jorge Espinosa also expressed that the Amerrisques gave their name to the Western Hemisphere, although he based his thesis, for the University of Louisiana, on historical maps drawn by John Cabot in 1497, where the name Amerrisque already appears five years before Christopher Columbus set foot in Nicaragua in 1502.
