= Meurig ap Idnerth =

Meurig ap Idnerth (Mauric/Meuruc, [son] of Idnerth) was an early 6th-century king of Buellt, a medieval Welsh kingdom. Little is known of King Meurig, who ruled circa 510 to 545. He was succeeded by his son Pawl ap Meurig (r. 545–580).

Meurig ap Idnerth should not be confused with Meurig (ap Madog) ab Idnerth, a 12th-century figure.
