= Martin Waldseemüller =

German cartographer and scholar (c. 1470 – 1520)

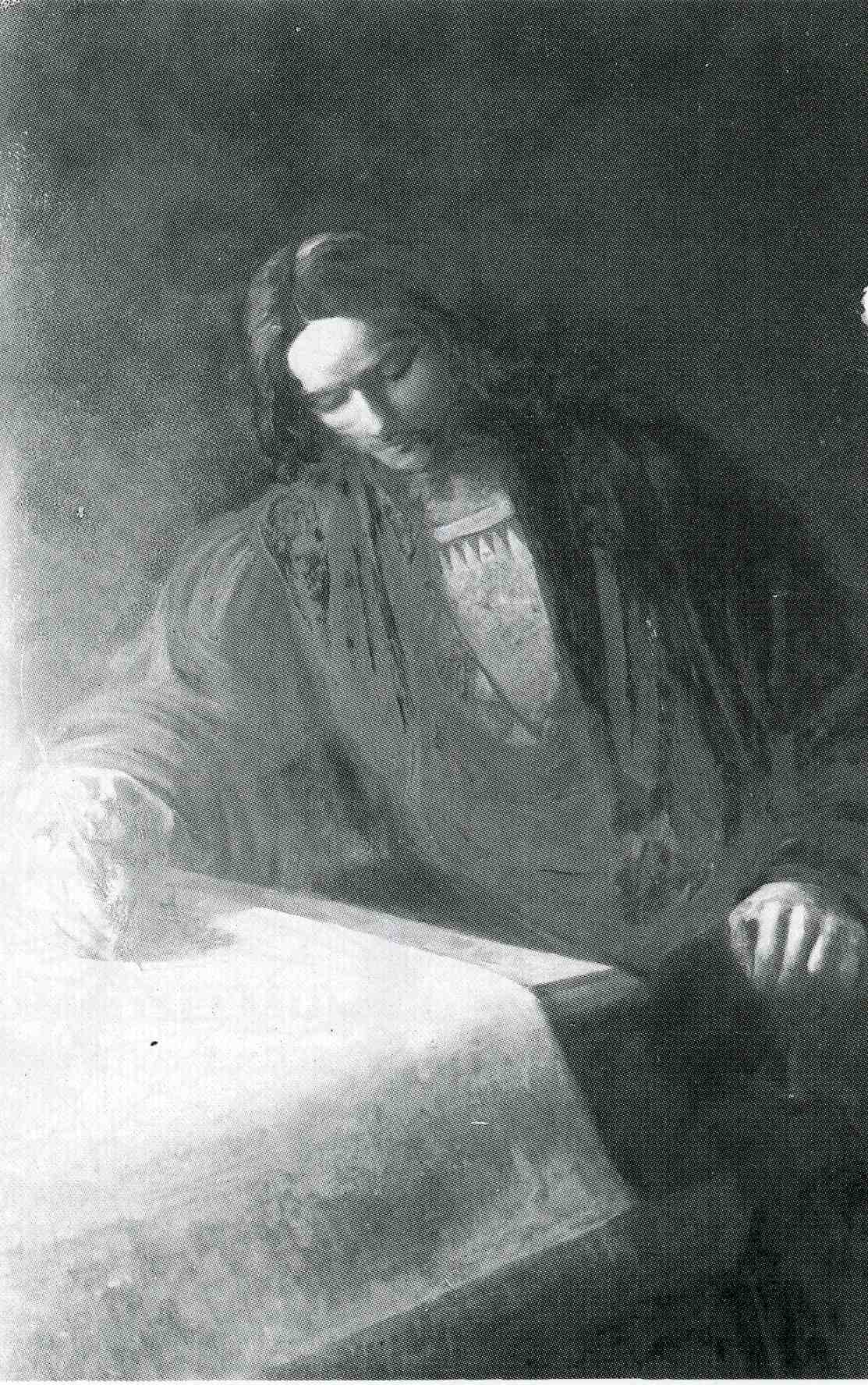
- Martin Waldseemüller (19th-century painting)
- Born: c. 1470; Wolfenweiler, Margraviate of Baden, Holy Roman Empire (now Schallstadt, Germany)
- Died: 16 March 1520 (aged 49–50); Saint Dié, Duchy of Lorraine, Holy Roman Empire (now Saint-Dié-des-Vosges, France)
- Education: University of Freiburg
- Occupation: Cartographer
- Movement: German Renaissance

Martin Waldseemüller (c. 1470 – 16 March 1520) was a German cartographer and humanist scholar. Sometimes known by the Hellenized form of his name, Hylacomylus, his work was influential among contemporary cartographers. His collaborator Matthias Ringmann and he are credited with the first recorded usage of the word America to name a portion of the New World in honour of Italian explorer Amerigo Vespucci in a world map they delineated in 1507. The same map was the first to show the Americas as a distinct landmass clearly separated from Asia by the Pacific Ocean. Waldseemüller was also the first to produce a printed globe and the first to create a printed wall map of Europe. A set of his maps printed as an appendix to the 1513 edition of Ptolemy's Geography is considered to be the first example of a modern atlas.

== Life and works ==
Details of Waldseemüller's life are scarce. He was born around 1470 in the German town of Wolfenweiler. His father was a butcher and moved to Freiburg (now Freiburg im Breisgau) in about 1480. Records show that Waldseemüller was enrolled in 1490 at the University of Freiburg, where Gregor Reisch, a noted humanist scholar, was one of his influential teachers; the printer Johannes Schott was his classmate. After finishing at the university, he lived in Basel, where he was ordained a priest, and apparently, gained experience in printing and engraving while working with the printer community in Basel.

Around 1500, an association of humanist scholars formed in Saint Dié, in the Duchy of Lorraine, under the patronage of René II, Duke of Lorraine. They called themselves the Gymnasium Vosagense and their leader was Walter Lud. Their initial intention was to publish a new edition of Ptolemy's Geography, as announced in 1507 by Lud: ‘It will soon be possible to see more numerous and truer details of this country [the unknown land lately discovered by the King of Portugal] in the Ptolemy revised and greatly augmented by us and Martin Waldseemüller’. The full title of their 1507 world map reflected this intention. Waldseemüller was invited to join the group and contribute his skills as a cartographer. How he came to the group's attention is unclear, but Lud later described him as a master cartographer. Matthias Ringmann was also brought into the group because of his previous work with the Geography and his knowledge of Greek and Latin. Ringmann and Waldseemüller soon became friends and collaborators.

=== 1507 world map ===
In 1506, the Gymnasium obtained a French translation of the Soderini Letter, a booklet attributed to Amerigo Vespucci that provided a sensational account of four alleged Vespucci voyages to explore the coast of lands recently discovered in the western Atlantic. The Gymnasium surmised that this was the "new world" or the "antipodes" hypothesized by classical writers. The Soderini Letter gave Vespucci credit for discovery of this new continent and implied that newly obtained Portuguese maps were based on his explorations. They decided to put aside the Geography for the moment and publish a brief Introduction to Cosmography with an accompanying world map. The Introduction was written by Ringmann and included a Latin translation of the Soderini Letter. In a preface to the letter, Ringmann wrote

"I see no reason why anyone could properly disapprove of a name derived from that of Amerigo, the discoverer, a man of sagacious genius. A suitable form would be Amerige, meaning Land of Amerigo, or America, since Europe and Asia have received women's names."

Universalis Cosmographia, Waldseemüller's 1507 world map, which was the first to show the Americas separate from Asia

While Ringmann was writing the Introduction, Waldseemüller focused on the creation of a world map using an aggregation of sources, including maps based on the works of Ptolemy, Henricus Martellus, Alberto Cantino, and Nicolò de Caverio. In addition to a large 12-panel wall map, Waldseemüller created a smaller, simplified globe. The wall map was decorated with prominent portraits of Ptolemy and Vespucci. The map and globe were notable for showing the New World as a continent separate from Asia and for naming the southern landmass America. By April 1507, the map, globe and accompanying book, Introduction to Cosmography, were published. A thousand copies were printed and sold throughout Europe.

The Introduction and map were a great success, and four editions were printed in the first year alone. The map was widely used in universities and was influential among cartographers who admired the craftsmanship that went into its creation. In the following years, other maps were printed that often incorporated the name America. Although Waldseemüller had intended the name to apply only to a specific part of Brazil, other maps applied it to the entire continent. In 1538, Gerardus Mercator used America to name both the north and south continents on his influential map, and by this point, the name was securely fixed on the New World.

=== Ptolemy's Geography (1513) ===
After 1507, Waldseemüller and Ringmann continued to collaborate on a new edition of Ptolemy's Geography. In 1508, Ringmann travelled to Italy and obtained a Greek manuscript of Geography (Codex Vaticanum Graecorum 191). With this key reference, they continued to make progress and Waldseemüller was able to finish his maps. Completion was forestalled, though, when their patron, Duke René II, died in 1508. The new edition was finally printed in 1513 by Johannes Schott in Strasbourg. By then, Waldseemüller had pulled out of the project and was not credited for his cartographic work. Nevertheless, his maps were recognized as important contributions to the science of cartography and were considered a standard reference work for many decades.

About 20 of Waldseemüller's tabulae modernae (modern maps) were included in the new Geography as a separate appendix, Claudii Ptolemaei Supplementem. This supplement constitutes the first modern atlas. Maps of Lorraine and the upper Rhine region were the first printed maps of those regions and were probably based on survey work done by Waldseemüller himself.

The world map published in the 1513 Geography seems to indicate that Waldseemüller had second thoughts about the name and the nature of the lands discovered in the western Atlantic. The New World was no longer clearly shown as a continent separate from Asia, and the name America had been replaced with Terra Incognita (Unknown Land). What caused him to make these changes is not clear, but perhaps he was influenced by contemporary criticism that Vespucci had usurped Columbus's primacy of discovery.

=== Other works ===
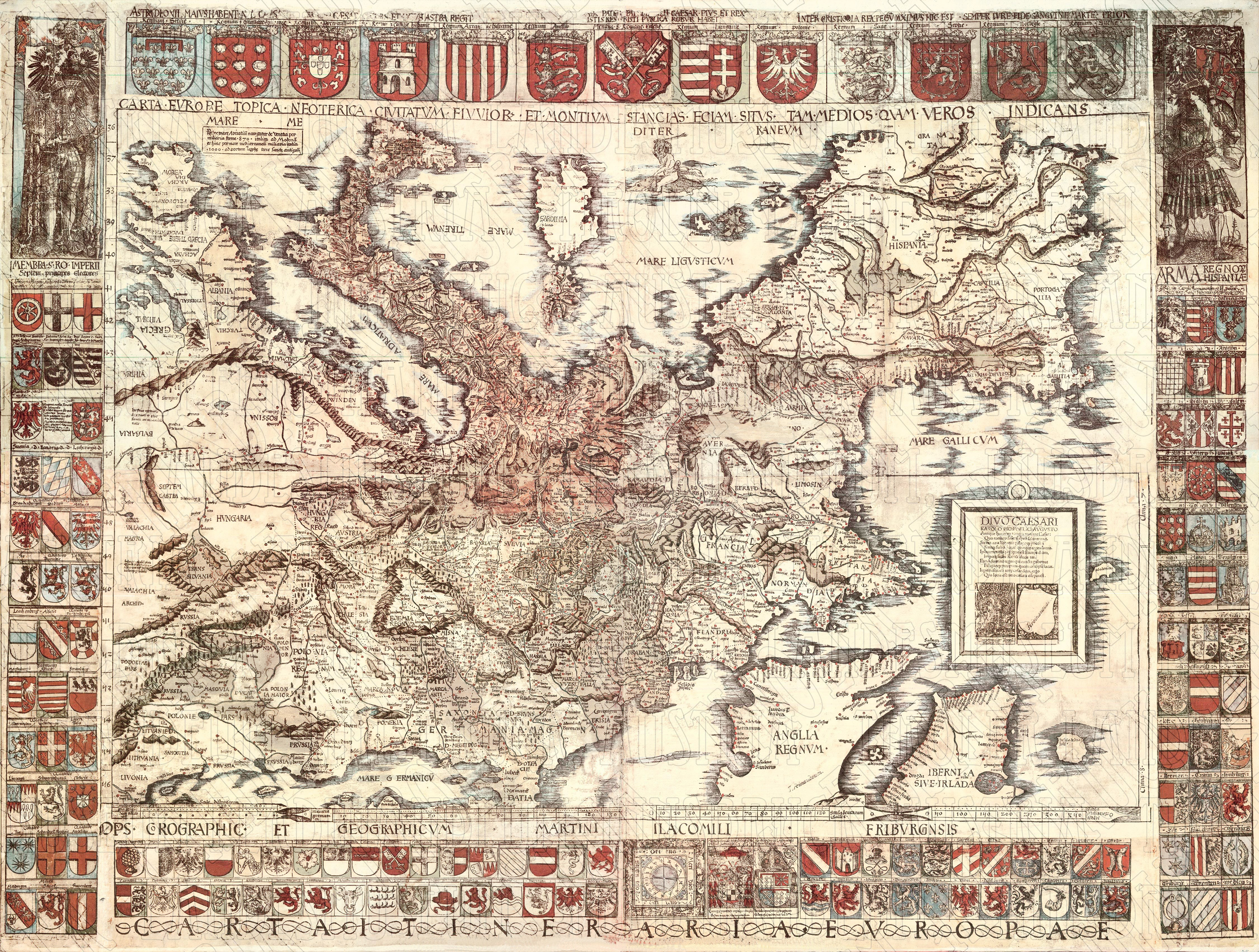
Carta Itineraria Europae from 1520: South is at the top. Great Britain is at bottom right, titled 'Anglia Regnum'.

Waldseemüller was also interested in surveying and surveying instruments. In 1508, he contributed a treatise on surveying and perspective to the fourth edition of Gregor Reisch's Margarita Philosophica. He included an illustration of a forerunner to the theodolite, a surveying instrument he called the polimetrum. In 1511, he published the Carta Itineraria Europae, a road map of Europe that showed important trade routes and pilgrim routes from central Europe to Santiago de Compostela, Spain. It was the first printed wall map of Europe.

In 1516, he produced another large-scale wall map of the world, the Carta Marina Navigatoria, printed in Strasbourg. It was designed in the style of portolan charts and consisted of 12 printed sheets.

The Paris Green Globe (or Globe vert), has been attributed to Waldseemüller by experts at the Bibliothèque Nationale, but the attribution is not universally accepted.

Waldseemüller died without a will on 16 March 1520 in Saint Dié in the Upper Rhenish Circle of the Holy Roman Empire, where he had served as a canon in the collegiate Church of Saint Dié since 1514.

== 1507 map rediscovered ==
The 1507 wall map was lost for a long time, but a copy was found in Schloss Wolfegg in southern Germany by Joseph Fischer in 1901. It is the only known copy and was purchased by the United States Library of Congress in May 2003 for $10 million, the highest price paid to that time for a historical document. Five copies of Waldseemüller's globular map survive in the form of "gores": printed map sections that were intended to be cut out and pasted onto a wooden globe.

== Honours ==
- Waldseemüller Rock in Antarctica is named after Martin Waldseemüller.

== See also ==
- Waldseemüller map
- Naming of the Americas
- History of the Americas
- Richard Amerike
- History of cartography
- List of Catholic clergy scientists
- List of German inventors and discoverers

== Bibliography ==
- David Brown: 16th-Century Mapmaker's Intriguing Knowledge, in: The Washington Post, 2008-11-17, p. A7
- Peter W. Dickson: "The Magellan Myth: Reflections on Columbus, Vespucci and the Waldseemueller Map of 1507", Printing Arts Press, 2007, 2009 (Second Edition)
- Fernández-Armesto, Felipe (2007). Amerigo: The Man Who Gave his Name to America. New York: Random House. ISBN 9781400062812.
- Herbermann, Charles George (ed.), The Cosmographiæ introductio of Martin Waldseemüller in facsimile, followed by the Four voyages of Amerigo Vespucci, with their translation into English (1907)
- Hessler, John W. (2008). The naming of America : Martin Waldseemüller's 1507 world map and the Cosmographiae introductio. Giles. ISBN 978-1904832492.
- King, Robert J. (2022). "The Antipodes on Martin Waldseemuller's 1507 World Map". The Globe (91): 43–60. ProQuest 2666975853.
- Lester, Toby (2009a) Putting America on the Map, Smithsonian, Volume 40, Number 9, p. 78, December 2009
- Lester, Toby (2009). The Fourth Part of the World: An Astonishing Epic of Global Discovery, Imperial Ambition, and the Birth of America. New York: Free Press. ISBN 9781416535317.
- Meurer, Peter H. (2007). "Cartography in the German Lands, 1450–1650". In Woodward, David (ed.). The History of Cartography, Volume 3: Cartography in the European Renaissance, Part 2 (PDF). University of Chicago. pp. 1204–1207. ISBN 978-0-226-90734-5.
- Seymour Schwartz: Putting "America" on the Map, the Story of the Most Important Graphic Document in the History of the United States, Prometheus Books, Amherst, New York, 2007
- Van Duzer, Chet; Larger, Benoît (2011). "Martin Waldseemuller's Death Date". Imago Mundi. 63 (2).
- Van Duzer, Chet. "The Annotations in the 1525 Ptolemy in the Huntington Library: The Continuing Influence of Martin Waldseemüller's World Map of 1507." Huntington Library Quarterly 85, no. 3 (2022): 517–538.
- Wolff, Hans (1992). "Martin Waldseemuller". In Wolff, Hans (ed.). America: Early Maps of the New World. Munich: Prestel. pp. 111–126. ISBN 3791312324.
