= Richard Amerike =

Anglo-Welsh merchant and customs officer

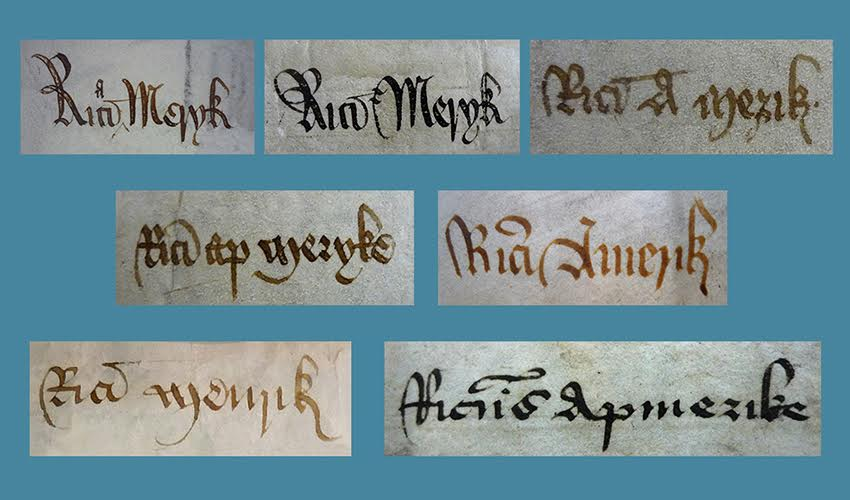
Variants of Richard Ap Meryk's name as found in contemporary documents

Richard ap Meryk (or ap Meurig), anglicised to Richard Amerike (or Ameryk) (c. 1440–1503) was an English merchant, royal customs officer and later, sheriff of Bristol. Several claims have been made for Amerike by popular writers of the late twentieth century. One was that he was the major funder of the voyage of exploration launched from Bristol by the Venetian John Cabot in 1497, and that Amerike was the owner of Cabot's ship, the Matthew. The other claim revived a theory first proposed in 1908 by a Bristolian scholar and amateur historian, Alfred Hudd. Hudd's theory, greatly elaborated by later writers, suggested that the continental name America was derived from Amerike's surname in gratitude for his sponsorship of Cabot's successful discovery expedition to 'the new World'. However, neither claim is backed up by hard evidence, and the consensus view is that America is named after Amerigo Vespucci, the Italian explorer.

== Biography ==
"Amerike" is an anglicised spelling of the Welsh name ap Meurig, ap Meuric or ap Meryk, which means "son of Meurig". It was, however, only one of the many different ways that the customs officer's name was rendered, even in official documents. The "Amerike" version was noted by some modern historians because it looked like "America" and because this was how his name was spelled on a tomb brass created for his daughter in 1538.

Ap Meryk's place and date of birth are unknown. One modern author suggests that Richard Amerike was born in 1445 at Meryk Court, Weston under Penyard, near Ross-on-Wye, Herefordshire. He may have been born earlier than this, since one of Amerike's daughters, Joan, was married to a future lawyer, John Broke, by April 1479. While there were certainly Merricks in and around Weston under Penyard, Richard Amerike's genealogy and connection to Merrick Court have not been verified. The only contemporary document to refer to his background states that he was from Chepstow, a town in Monmouthshire, Wales.

Little is known of the first thirty years of Ap Meryk's life. His wife, married at an unknown date, was called Lucy. The latter part of Amerike's adult life was spent in, or near, Bristol. This was one of the largest ports of medieval England. Amerike prospered as a merchant and, after 1485, as a gentleman and an officer of the Crown. He is first found in Bristol customs accounts in 1472, trading in Irish fish. The published customs accounts of 1479–1480 show him continuing to trade to Ireland, but also participating in Bristol's valuable trade with Portugal and Bordeaux. In other years he also traded to Spain. Amerike was a burgess of Bristol by at least the mid-1470s. Becoming a burgess would have both admitted him as a freeman of the city and marked him as a member of its political elite. By this time he was sufficiently wealthy to lend £50 towards the ransom from Breton pirates of a great-nephew of William Canynges. A Bristol tax return of 1484 records that his household servants included an Icelander. He was also buying land. By the early 1490s Amerike's main landed estate, acquired by purchase, seems to have been in Long Ashton on the Somerset side of the River Avon.

When Amerike traded as a merchant, he would have used a distinctive merchant's mark to identify his goods. Unfortunately when Amerike shipped on the Trinity of Bristol for a voyage to Andalucia in 1480 the purser, whose private accounts survive, failed to record the mark of Amerike, or indeed of any other merchant shipping. The mark associated with Amerike in modern times belongs to a different man, living a century later.

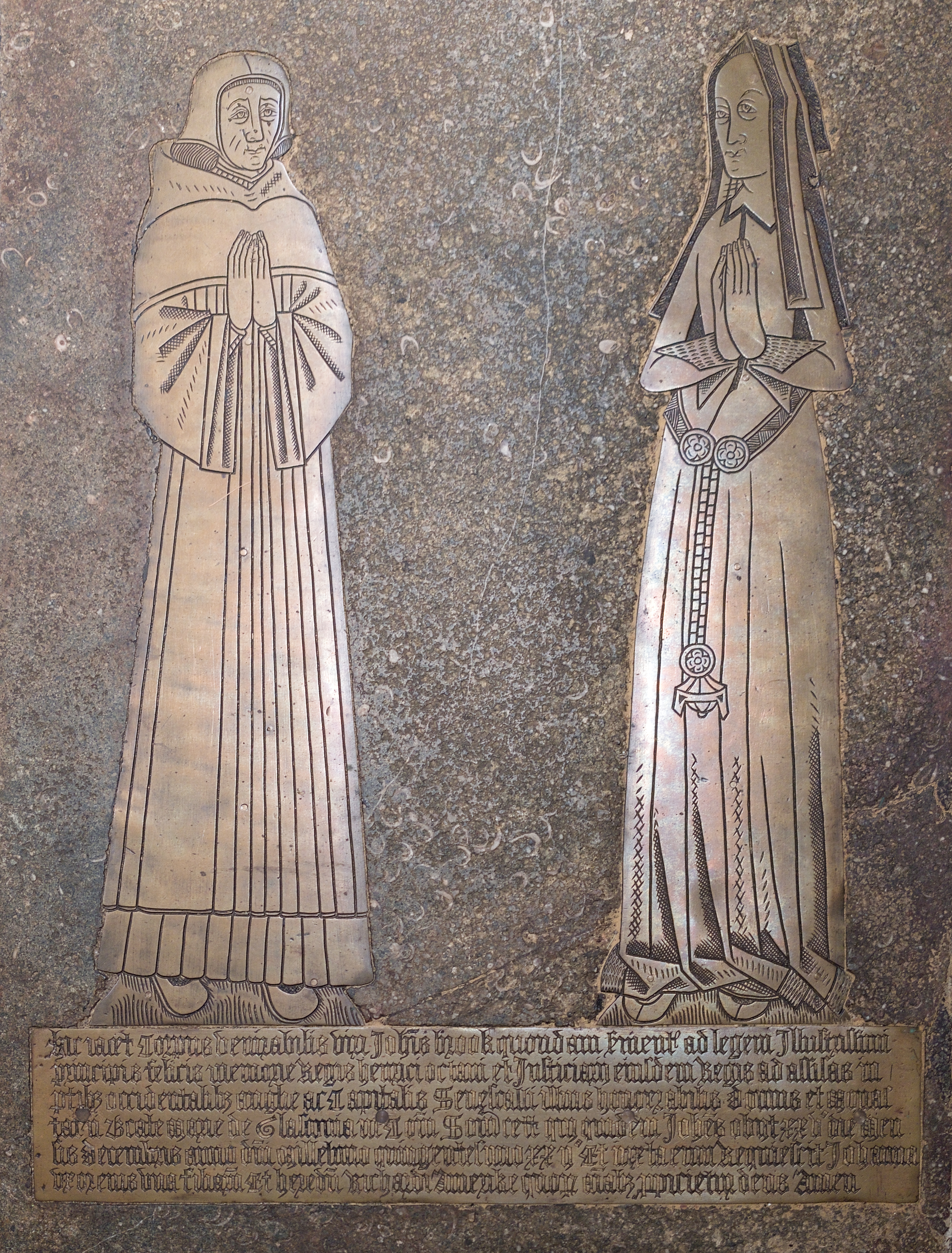
The 1522 monumental brass of John Broke (or Brook). On the right side is his wife, Joan, daughter of Richard Amerike.

In 1485 Richard Amerike was appointed to the customs service in Bristol's neighbouring port of Bridgwater, with the post of controller of customs. This should have meant that he dwelled within the confines of the port (which included Minehead and Combwich), but whether he did so is unknown. In September 1486 Amerike became one of the customs officials in Bristol, holding the post of King's Customs Officer, known as a "Customer", from 1486 until December 1502. During his period of office he was several times accused of malpractice, including false accounting, and was obliged to pay a substantial sum of money to the King, Henry VII, for his pardon. As a customs officer Amerike could not hold high civic office since this was forbidden by Statute but at the first election after he had ceased to be Customer, he was appointed as one of the city's two sheriffs. He died in post, probably around December 1503, and was replaced as sheriff by Robert Thorne. Amerike's precise date of death and place of burial are unknown. His heirs were his daughters, only one of whom is known. Joan (or Jane) Broke (née Amerike) (d. 1538) lies beside her husband, John Broke, in the church of St Mary Redcliffe, Bristol. Their tomb brass names Richard Amerike as her father, and once included the arms of both Broke and Amerike. Some two centuries after the armorial scutcheon disappeared, the arms of Amerike were described as "paly of six, or and azure, on a fess gules, three mullets argent".

== Richard Amerike and John Cabot ==
Popular interest in Amerike centres on his association with the Venetian explorer Zuan (Giovanni) Caboto, better known as John Cabot. Under the authority of King Henry VII of England John Cabot led three voyages of discovery from Bristol in search of new lands and a route to the supposed riches of the East. The first expedition, of 1496, was abortive. The second, in 1497, was the famous expedition in the Matthew of Bristol, which found "new land" that Cabot thought was part of Asia but was probably the modern Newfoundland. The outcome of the third voyage of 1498 is unclear, and the subject of much speculation. It has always been thought that funding for the voyages came from Bristol merchants. This made sense, since under the terms of Cabot's letters patent from Henry VII, which gave him his authority, all trade from any new lands discovered was to pass through Bristol. However, no list of sponsors has ever been found, and the only proven funding, in amounts insufficient for a voyage, came from the London branch of the Florentine banking house of the Bardi and, in 1498, from Henry VII. Other names have been suggested.

The idea that Richard Amerike was an important supporter of Cabot gained currency in the late 20th century among popular historians, as did the notion that Amerike was owner and main funder of the Matthew, Cabot's ship of 1497. Evan Jones and Margaret Condon, of the University of Bristol's "Cabot Project" have found no documentary evidence for any of this. Indeed, they suggest that Ap Meryk may have been hostile to Cabot because the terms of the explorer's royal patent would have made it difficult for the port's customs officers to profit from any trade established to new lands. This may explain why the customs officers created problems for the explorer by refusing to pay the initial instalment of the pension he was granted in December 1497, despite the existence of an order from the King stating that this should happen.

Richard Amerike did have one important responsibility towards John Cabot. Amerike, and his fellow customs officer, Arthur Kemys, were the paymasters for the pension of £20 a year granted by Henry VII to John Cabot on 13 December 1497. Cabot's grant specified that he was to be paid out of revenues arising from the customs dues payable to the Crown on goods exported and imported in the port of Bristol by way of merchandise. Amerike and Kemys were responsible for collecting those revenues and accounting for them to the Exchequer at Westminster. Local payment in Bristol made a lot of sense for the explorer and, provided all the documentation was in order, Amerike and Kemys would then be able to claim the payment to Cabot as a legitimate expense when they accounted for their revenues in the Exchequer at the end of the accounting year. In the mid-1890s Edward Scott, a "Keeper" or senior archivist at the British Museum, and from 1891 Keeper of the Muniments in Westminster Abbey, discovered a stray Exchequer document that showed this process and two years-worth of pension payments to Cabot by Amerike and his colleague in 1497–1499. In 1897 the document was published in transcript and facsimile by Scott and the Bristol antiquarian Alfred Hudd. Kemys and "Richard ap Meryke" or "a Meryk" are named at the head of every section of the account. The "Cabot Roll" remains an important discovery for the history of John Cabot.

== Theory of the naming of America ==
In 1908, the local Bristol antiquarian Alfred Hudd first proposed the theory that the word America had evolved from Amerike or ap Meryk. Hudd proposed his theory in a paper which was read at 21 May 1908 meeting of the Clifton Antiquarian Club, and which appeared in Volume 7 of the club's Proceedings. Hudd's speculation has found support from more than one 21st century author, who expanded Hudd's argument with speculations about the voyages of the Matthew and later trade with the Eastern seaboard, which Amerike is known to have had financial interests in. It is proposed that as a main investor, Amerike's name would have been noted on ships' rutters or working charts, indicating the locations where his cargo had been traded. It is further supposed that such secret documents could have been seized by Spanish explorers when a British voyage was mysteriously lost during the same period that Amerigo Vespucci was mapping the coast of Brazil -this information later reaching Waldseemüller. However, this cannot be verifiably proved unless original documents come to light. The consensus view continues to be that America is named after Amerigo Vespucci, the Italian explorer.

Amerike's coat of arms is coincidentally also reminiscent of the modern Flag of the United States (Stars and Stripes).

== Bibliography ==
- Rodney Broome, Terra Incognita: The True Story of How America Got Its Name, (US 2001: ISBN 0-944638-22-8)
- Rodney Broome, Amerike: The Briton who gave America its name, (UK 2002: ISBN 0-7509-2909-X)
- Felipe Fernández-Armesto, Amerigo, the man who gave his name to America, (UK 2006: ISBN 029784802X)
- Evan T. Jones and Margaret M. Condon, Cabot and Bristol's Age of Discovery: The Bristol Discovery Voyages 1480–1508 (University of Bristol, Nov. 2016). See, especially, chapter 8 'The naming of the land', pp. 71–78.
