= Jules Marcou =

French-Swiss-American geologist (1824–1898)

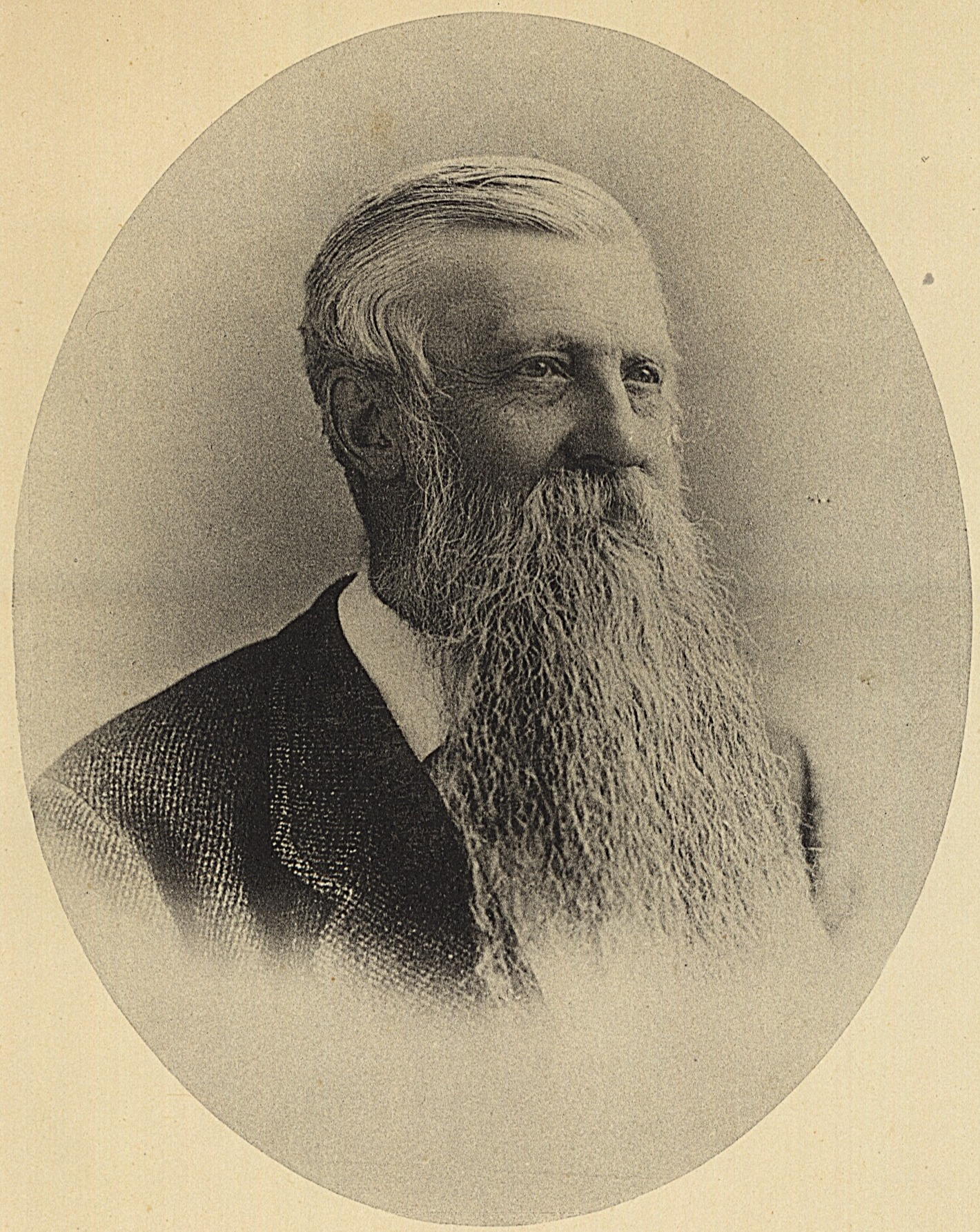
- Jules Marcou c. 1880
- Born: April 20, 1824; Salins, Jura, France
- Died: April 17, 1898 (aged 73); Cambridge, Massachusetts, U.S.
- Occupation: Geologist
- Spouse: Jane Belknap (m. 1850)
- Children: 2

Academic background
- Education: Collège Saint Louis

Academic work
- Institutions: Sorbonne; Polytechnic School of Zurich; Museum of Comparative Zoology

Jules Marcou (April 20, 1824 – April 17, 1898) was a French-Swiss-American geologist.

== Biography ==
He was born in Salins, in the département of Jura, in France. He was educated at Besançon and at the Collège Saint Louis, Paris. After completing his studies, he made several trips through Switzerland to recover his health. These travels led him to devote himself to natural science. During these travels, he met Jules Thurmann (1804–1855), who introduced him to Louis Agassiz.

During 1845, he worked with Thurmann on a geological survey of the Jura Mountains. He was appointed assistant of the mineralogical department of the Sorbonne in 1846, and also classified its collection of fossils. During this time, he conducted geological investigations in various parts of Europe. In 1847 he went to North America as traveling geologist for the Jardin des Plantes, charged with studying the United States and the English possessions in North America. The next year, he joined Agassiz in Boston and accompanied him to the Lake Superior region, visiting the copper mines of the Keweenaw Peninsula, Lake Huron, and Niagara. After six months, he returned to Cambridge, Massachusetts, and sent minerals he had collected to Paris.

In January 1849, Marcou directed his attention to the geology of New Jersey, Pennsylvania, and Virginia. Later he crossed the Allegheny Mountains, visiting the Mammoth Cave and other localities, and then traversed Canada. He returned to Europe for a short time in 1850. In 1853 he published a Geological Map of the United States, and the British Provinces of North America. In 1853 he was hired by the United States government to serve as a geologist for the Pacific Railroad Survey along the 35th parallel, one of a series of explorations of the American West to find possible routes for a transcontinental railroad. In this role he became the first geologist to cross the United States. He subsequently made a geological section extending from the Mississippi River to the Pacific Ocean.

In 1855, he became professor of geology and palaeontology at the polytechnic school of Zürich but relinquished this office in 1859. His Lettres sur les roches du Jura et leur distribution géographique dans les deux hémisphères (published 1857...1860) included one of the earliest proposals that a land bridge had once existed between the Old World and New World.

In 1861, again returned to the United States, when he assisted Louis Agassiz in initiating the Museum of Comparative Zoology, and was in charge of its palaeontological division from 1860 to 1864. Subsequently, he devoted himself to scientific research until 1875, when he again began service for the United States government, and accompanied the Wheeler Survey to Southern California.

== Personal life and death ==
Jules Marcou married Jane Belknap of Boston in 1850. They had two children. He died in Cambridge, Massachusetts, in 1898 and was interred there in Mount Auburn Cemetery.

== Publications ==
- Life, letters, and works of Louis Agassiz (1895)
- Cretaceous formations of the Jura
- Dyas (Permian) of Nebraska
- Taconic rocks of Vermont and Canada
- American Geological Classification and Nomenclature (1888)
- Geological Map of the World (1861, 2nd edition 1875)
- A Little More Light on the United States Geological Survey (1892)
- Lettres sur les roches du Jura et leur distribution géographique dans les deux hémisphères (1857–1860)
- Geology of North America (1858)
- New research on the origin of the name América

== Sources ==
- (fr) : Durand-Delga M., Moreau R., Jules Marcou (1824-1898) précurseur français de la géologie nord-américaine, L'Harmattan, 200 pages, 2003.
