= Matthias Ringmann =

Alsatian humanist and cosmographer

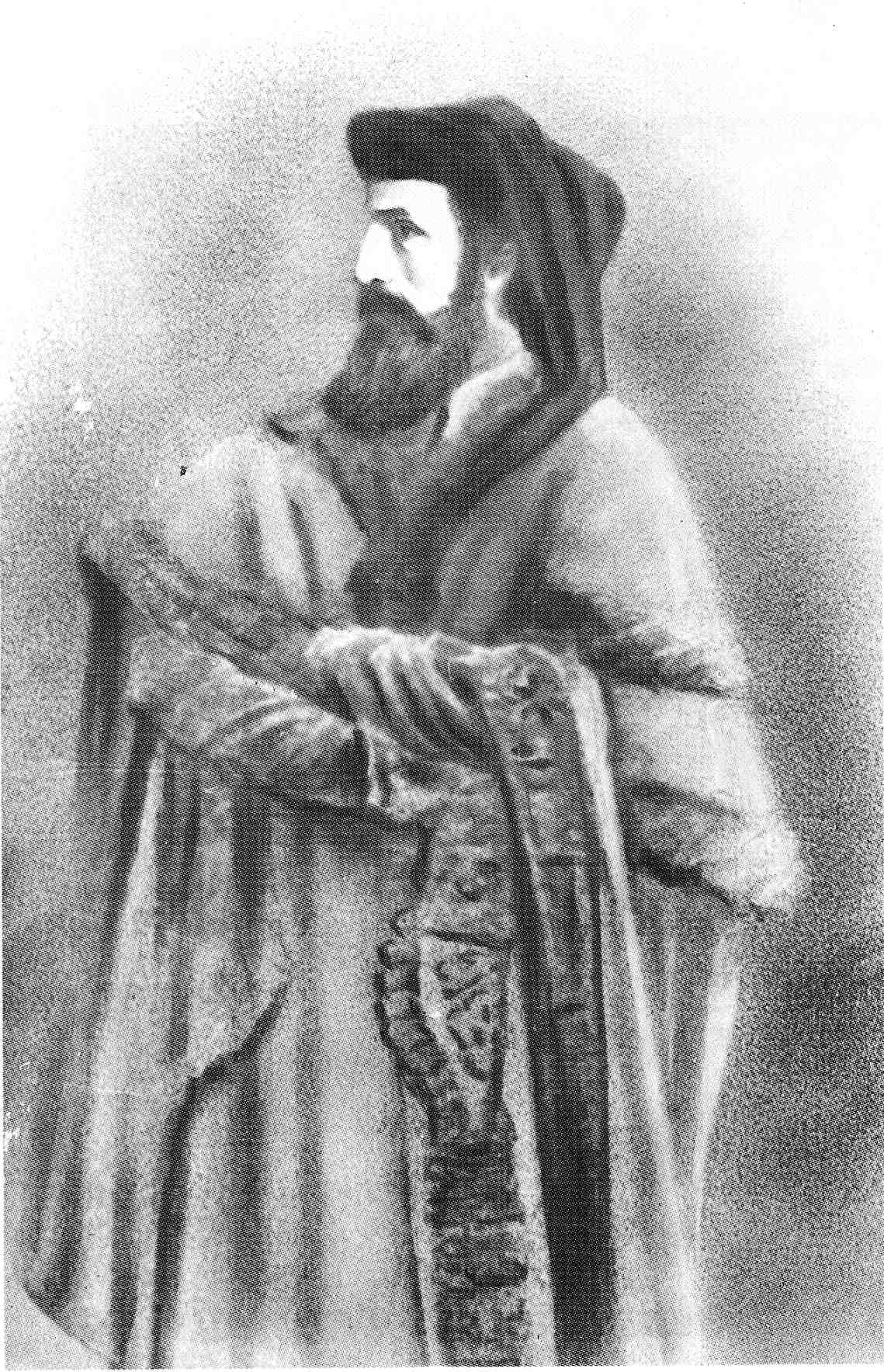
Matthias Ringmann (19th-century painting)

Matthias Ringmann (1482–1511), also known as Philesius Vogesigena, was an Alsatian German humanist scholar and cosmographer. Along with cartographer Martin Waldseemüller, he is credited with the first documented usage of the word America, on the 1507 map Universalis Cosmographia in honour of the Italian explorer Amerigo Vespucci.

== Biography ==
Ringmann was born in 1482 in the small farming village of Eichhoffen, Alsace. In 1498 he enrolled at the University of Heidelberg and then went on to study at the University of Paris. He pursued a course of studies typical for a humanist of the day, including Greek, Latin, classical literature, history, mathematics and cosmography. In 1505 he settled in Strassburg, worked at a printing press, and began to study Ptolemy's Geography.

Mundus Novus, a book attributed to Amerigo Vespucci, was widely published throughout Europe after 1504. An edition was published in Rome in 1504 by Eucharius Silber and a copy of this was brought to Strassburg by Johannes Michaelis, a Swedish apostolic notary from Vyborg in Karelia, who had been present at a papal consistory in Rome held to receive the Portuguese ambassador, when the voyages of Vespucci and other recent Portuguese voyages and discoveries were discussed. Ringmann was familiar with the speculation of classical authors that a giant, unknown continent lay on the other side of the world and he became convinced that this is what Vespucci had encountered. Ringmann reprinted Mundus Novus in August 1505 in De Ora antarctica per regem Portugallie pridem inventa (The antarctic country discovered some time since by the King of Portugal). He appended to it a declaration by Michaelis that he was present at the consistory in Rome, which vouched for its veracity. In July 1507, Ringmann wrote to a friend calling Vespucci "a great man of brave courage" and included this letter in the introduction to his reprint. Later that same year, he traveled to Italy where he likely searched for more information about Vespucci and the lands that he had explored.

In 1506, he began another project, the first German translation of Julius Caesar's Commentaries on the Gallic War. He used Ptolemy's Geography to identify the historic Roman place-names and associate them to their corresponding contemporary locations. His translation was published in 1507.

Meanwhile, an association of humanist scholars was forming in Saint-Dié under the patronage of René II, Duke of Lorraine. They called themselves the Gymnasium Vosagense and their leader was Walter Lud. Their intention was to publish a new edition of Ptolemy's Geography. Ringmann was brought into the group because of his previous work with the Geography and his knowledge of Greek and Latin. Martin Waldseemüller, a cartographer, was also hired to draw and illustrate the maps for the new publication.

In 1506, the Gymnasium obtained a French translation of the Soderini Letter as well as a Portuguese maritime map that detailed the coast of lands recently discovered in the western Atlantic. Ringmann again surmised that this was the "new world" or the "antipodes" hypothesized by classical writers. The Soderini Letter gave Vespucci credit for discovery of this new continent and implied that the Portuguese map was based on his explorations. They decided to put aside the Geography for the moment and publish a brief Introduction to Cosmography with an accompanying world map. The Introduction was written by Ringmann and included a Latin translation of the Soderini Letter. In a preface to the Letter, Ringmann wrote

I see no reason why anyone could properly disapprove of a name derived from that of Amerigo, the discoverer, a man of sagacious genius. A suitable form would be Amerige, meaning Land of Amerigo, or America, since Europe and Asia have received women's names.

A thousand copies of the Introduction and the accompanying world map were printed on April 25, 1507. It was the first time that the word America had appeared in print. In a later edition after Ringmann's death, Waldseemüller dropped the term America and named South America "Terra Nova", but the name America was already established.

After 1507, Ringmann and Waldseemüller continued working together on creating new edition of Ptolemy's Geography. In 1508 Ringmann returned to Italy and obtained a Greek Ptolemy manuscript (Codex Vaticanum Graecorum 191.). With this important reference they were apparently able to complete their project but the new Ptolemy was not published until after Ringmann's death. By 1509, Ringmann was seriously ill with tuberculosis but continued working.

In 1509, he published a card game, Grammatica Figurata, to make the grammatical rules of Donatus' Ars Minor, more appealing to children. He died in 1511 in Sélestat.

== Grammatica Figurata ==
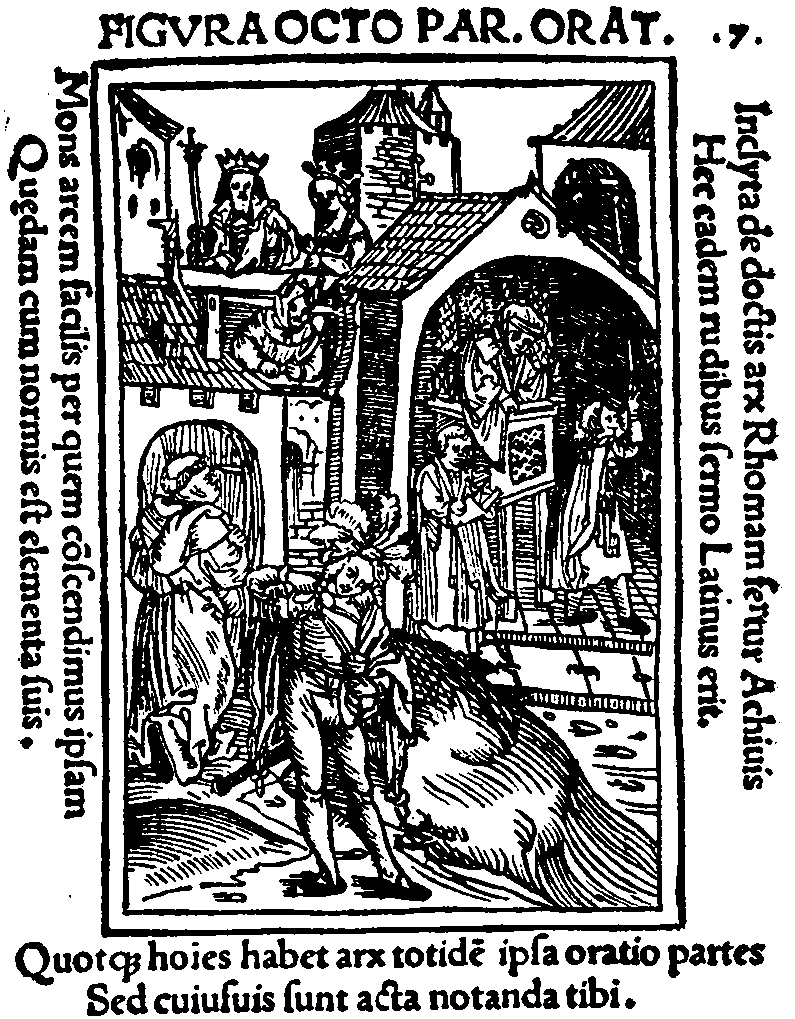
Grammatica Figurata (1509)

The Grammatica Figurata was first published by Mathias Ringmann in 1509. This work was an attempt to enliven Donatus' Ars Minor by printing up illustrated card sets for each grammatical rule. Apparently the children would have a card set. The rules are not explained at length, but a few hints are scattered here and there in the work. The final section on "Exclamations" has a sentence on how to figure out which student has won. Each card represented a part of speech, a gender, a case, or a tense, etc. Depending upon the teacher's questions a student would play the appropriate card or cards. Long believed to be lost, one copy of Grammatica figurata was found and reprinted in 1905.

== Works ==
- Waldseemüller, Martin, & Matthias Ringmann. Cosmographiae Introductio, (St. Die: 1507)
- Caesar, Julius. Ringmann Matthias (tr.) Julius der erst römisch Keiser von seinem Leben und Krieg, erstmals uss dem Latein in Tütsch gebracht vnd mit andrer Ordnung der Capittel und uil zusetz nüw getruckt. (Strassburg: Durch Joannem Grüninger, 1508).
- Ringmann, Matthias. Grammatica Figurata, (St. Die: 1509)
- Waldseemüller, Martin, & Matthias Ringmann (ed.). Clavdii Ptolemei Viri Alexandrini ... Geographie Opus Novissima Traductione E Grecorum Archetypis Castigatissime Pressum. (Strassburg: Johann Schott, 1520
