= Cosmographiae Introductio =

1507 book by Matthias Ringmann

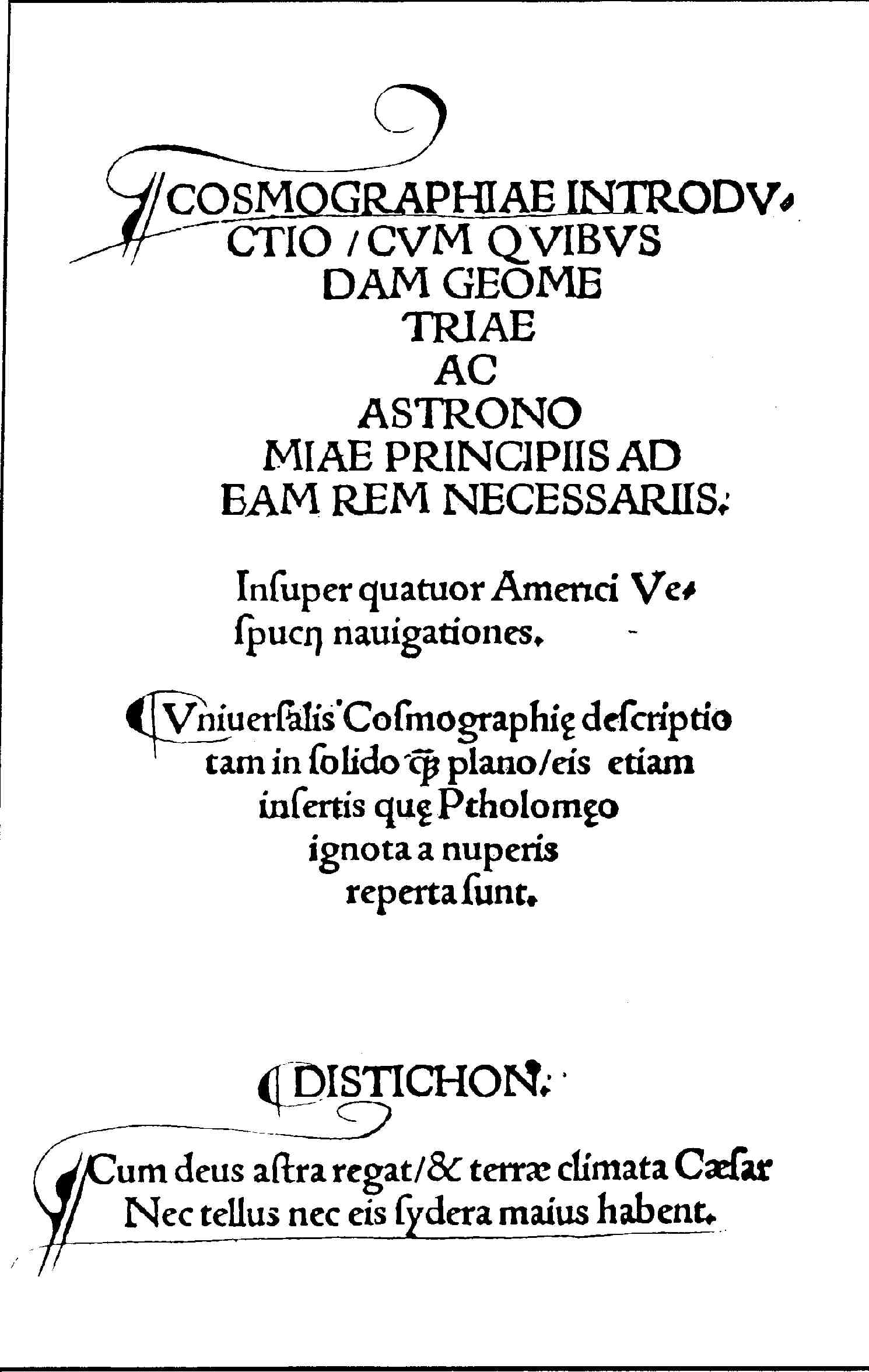
- Title page of Cosmographiae Introductio

Cosmographiae Introductio ("Introduction to Cosmography"; Saint-Dié, 1507) is a book that was published in 1507 (both times on April the 25th and on August the 29th, each time in two different ways, producing three different title pages), to accompany Martin Waldseemüller's printed globe and wall-map (Universalis Cosmographia). The book and map contain the first mention of the term 'America'. Waldseemüller's book and maps, along with his 1513 edition of Ptolemy’s Geography, were very influential and widely copied at the time.

It is widely held to have been written by Matthias Ringmann although some historians attribute it to Waldseemüller himself. The book includes the reason for using the name America in the wall map and the globe, and contains a Latin translation of the four journeys of Amerigo Vespucci as an appendix.

The full title of the book is: Cosmographiae introductio cum quibusdam geometriae ac astronomiae principiis ad eam rem necessariis. Insuper quatuor Americi Vespucii navigationes. Universalis Cosmographiae descriptio tam in solido quam plano, eis etiam insertis, quae Ptholomaeo ignota a nuperis reperta sunt.

(translation: Introduction to Cosmography With Certain Necessary Principles of Geometry and Astronomy To which are added The Four Voyages of Amerigo Vespucci A Representation of the Entire World, both in the Solid and Projected on the Plane, Including also lands which were Unknown to Ptolemy, and have been Recently Discovered)

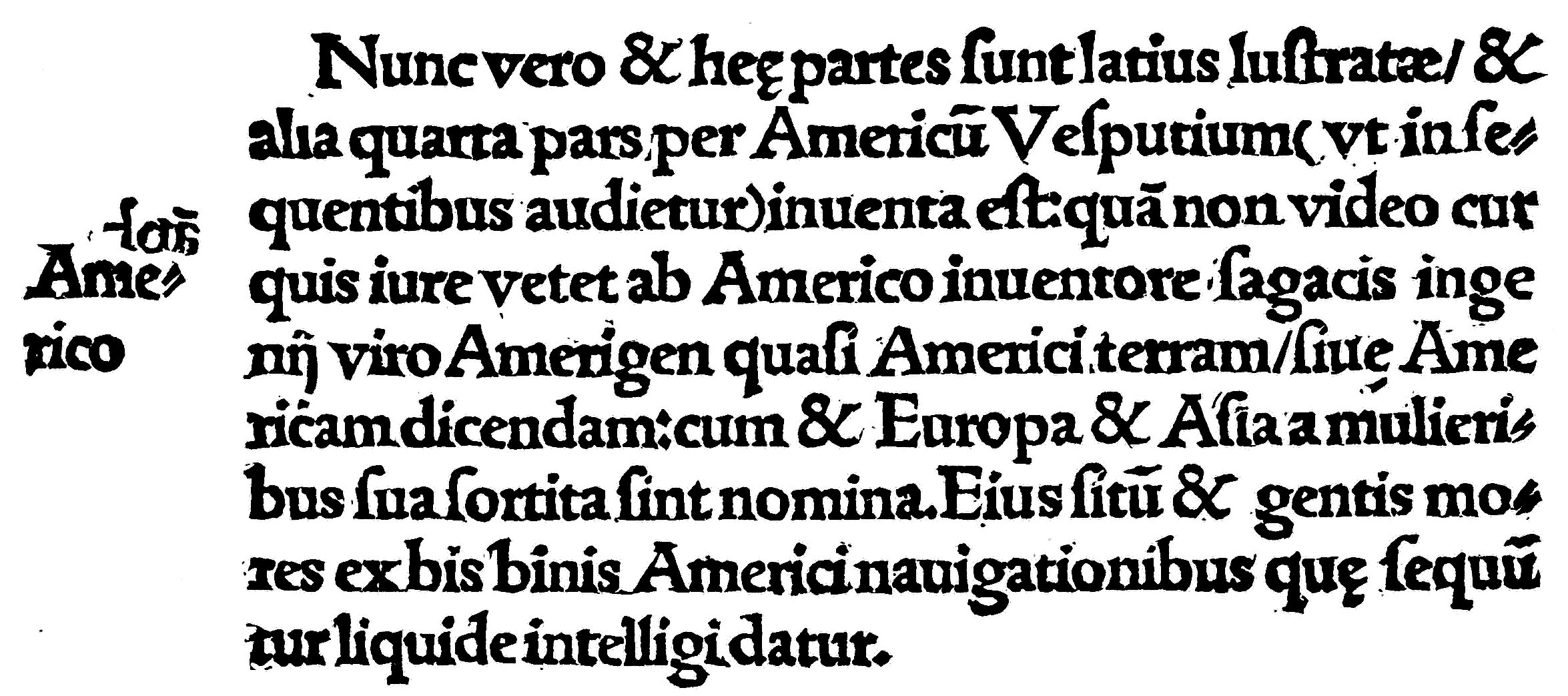
That part of the page of the 1507 (September) edition of the Cosmographiae Introductio in which the name of America is proposed for the New World. From Narrative and critical history of America, Volume 2 by Justin Winsor.

Universalis Cosmographia (map of 1507)

The map of the world in 1507, entitled Universalis cosmographia secundum Ptholomaei traditionem et Americi Vespucii aliorumque lustrationes, was published in an edition of 1000 copies, of which it seems only a single copy survives. The surviving copy was found in the library of Prince von Waldburg-Wolfegg-Waldsee in the Castle of Wolfegg in Württemberg. It was bought by the Library of Congress in 2001. This preservation seems to be due to several sheets being bound into a single cover by the cartographer, Johannes Schöner.

The map consists of twelve sections printed from woodcuts combined with metal types, each measuring 18 x 24.5 inches (46 x 62 cm). Each section is one of four, that form one of three zones. The map uses a modified Ptolemaic coniform projection with curved meridians to depict the entire surface of the Earth.

== Edition ==
- Cosmographiae introductio. Text of the Editio princeps of April 25, 1507 with source references, indices and newly drawn diagrams ed. by Horst Kranz, s. l. 2023. Zenodo. https://zenodo.org/records/7620211
