= Abya Yala =

Indigenous name for the North and South American continents

Abya Yala (from the Guna language: 'Abiayala', meaning 'mature land') is used by some Indigenous peoples of the Americas to refer to the Americas. The term is used by some indigenous organisations, institutions, and movements as a symbol of identity and respect for the land one inhabits. The increasing usage of the term can be viewed in the context of decolonization, as it serves to create an understanding that "land and discourse, territorio y palabra, cannot be disjointed" and a geography in which a struggle for sovereignty and resistance occurs on an everyday basis for Indigenous communities.

The name, which translates to 'land in its full maturity', 'land of lifeblood", or 'noble land that welcomes all' originates from the Guna people who once inhabited a region spanning from the northern coast of Colombia to the Darién Gap, and now live on the Caribbean coast of Panama, in the Comarca of Guna Yala. The term is Pre-Columbian.

The first explicit usage of the expression in its political sense was at the 2nd Continental Summit of Indigenous Peoples and Nationalities of Abya Yala, held in Quito in 2004. The symbolic and ideological significance of this summit is reflected in its rejection of neoliberal globalization, its reaffirmation of Indigenous peoples' rights to territorial autonomy, and its continuity with the earlier declarations made at the 2000 Teotihuacan Summit.

Despite each Indigenous group on the continent having unique endonyms for the regions they live in, the phrase "Abya Yala" is increasingly used in search of building a sense of unity and belonging amongst cultures which have a shared cosmovision (for instance a deep relationship with the land) and history of colonialism. Many Indigenous movements have adopted this designation to replace colonial names such as ‘Latin America’ to express a connection to the land, community and ancestral memory. The Bolivian indigenist Takir Mamani argues for the use of the term "Abya Yala" in the official declarations of Indigenous peoples' governing bodies, saying that "placing foreign names on our villages, our cities, and our continents is equivalent to subjecting our identity to the will of our invaders and their heirs." Thus, use of the term "Abya Yala" rather than a term such as New World or the Americas may have ideological implications indicating support for Indigenous rights, as it is regarded as a symbolic shift in Indigenous self-identification. Escobar describes this as "a telling element in the constitution of a diverse set of indigenous peoples as a novel cultural-political subject."

== See also ==
- Pindorama
- Turtle Island, a similar term referring to the continent of North America.
