= Americas =

Landmass comprising North and South America

Coordinates: 19°N 96°W

- Area: 42,549,000 km^{2} (16,428,000 sq mi)
- Population: ▲1.02 billion
- Population density: 22.67/km^{2} (58.74/sq mi)
- Demonym: American (see usage)
- Countries: 35
- Dependencies: 23
- Languages: Spanish, English, Portuguese, French, Haitian Creole, Quechua, Guaraní, Aymara, Nahuatl, Dutch, and many others
- Time zone: UTC−10 to UTC+0
- Largest cities: List: 1. São Paulo; 2. Lima; 3. Mexico City; 4. New York City; 5. Bogotá; 6. Rio de Janeiro; 7. Santiago; 8. Los Angeles; 9. Caracas; 10. Buenos Aires; Complete List of largest metropolitan areas and their cities
- UN M49 codes: 019 – Americas; 001 – World

The Americas, also collectively known as America, are a landmass comprising the totality of North America and South America. When viewed as a single continent, the Americas are the second largest continent by area after Asia and the third largest continent by population. The Americas make up most of the land in Earth's Western Hemisphere and constitute the "New World", in contrast to the "Old World" of Afro-Eurasia.

Along with their associated islands, the Americas cover 8% of Earth's total surface area and 28.4% of its land area. The topography is dominated by the American Cordillera, a long chain of mountains that runs the length of the west coast. The flatter eastern side of the Americas is dominated by large river basins, such as the Amazon, St. Lawrence River–Great Lakes, Mississippi, and La Plata basins. Since the Americas extend 14,000 km (8,700 mi) from north to south, the climate and ecology vary widely, from the arctic tundra of Northern Canada, Greenland, and Alaska, to the tropical rainforests in Central America and South America.

Humans first settled the Americas from Asia between 20,000 and 16,000 years ago. A second migration of Na-Dene speakers followed later from Asia. The subsequent migration of the Inuit into the neoarctic c. 3500 BCE completed what is generally regarded as the settlement by the Indigenous peoples of the Americas. The Norse colonization of North America saw several settlements established in Greenland, and perhaps on the mainland, however, these were later abandoned. The Spanish voyages of Christopher Columbus from 1492 to 1504 resulted in permanent contact with European (and subsequently, other Old World) powers, which eventually led to the Columbian exchange and inaugurated a period of exploration, conquest, and colonization whose effects and consequences persist to the present.

The Spanish presence involved the enslavement of large numbers of the indigenous population of the Americas. Diseases introduced from Europe and West Africa devastated the indigenous peoples, and the European powers colonized the Americas. Mass emigration from Europe, including large numbers of indentured servants, and importation of African slaves largely replaced the indigenous peoples in much of the Americas. Decolonization of the Americas began with the American Revolution in the 1770s and largely ended with the Spanish–American War in the late 1890s. Currently, almost all of the population of the Americas resides in independent countries; however, the legacy of the colonization and settlement by Europeans is that the Americas share many common cultural traits, most notably Christianity and the use of West European languages: primarily Spanish, English, Portuguese, French, and, to a lesser extent, Dutch.

The Americas are home to more than a billion inhabitants, two-thirds of whom reside in the United States, Brazil, and Mexico. It is home to eight megacities (metropolitan areas with 10 million inhabitants or more): Greater Mexico City (21.2 million), São Paulo (21.2 million), New York City (19.7 million), Los Angeles (18.8 million), Buenos Aires (15.6 million), Rio de Janeiro (13.0 million), Bogotá (10.4 million), and Lima (10.1 million).

== Etymology and naming ==
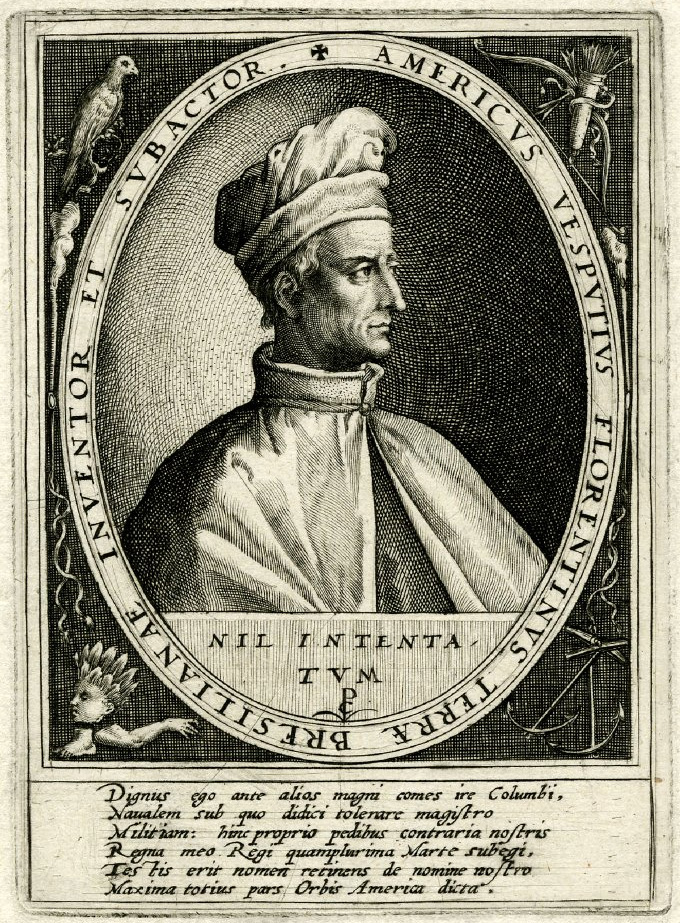
America is named after Italian explorer Amerigo Vespucci.

World map of Waldseemüller (Germany, 1507), which first used the name America (in the lower-left section, over South America)

The name "America" was first recorded in 1507. A world map created by Martin Waldseemüller was the earliest recorded use of the term. The name was also used (together with the related term Amerigen) in the Cosmographiae Introductio, apparently written by Matthias Ringmann, in reference to South America. It was applied to both North and South America by Gerardus Mercator in 1538.

It is generally accepted that he derived the "America" nomenclature from the name of Amerigo Vespucci, an Italian explorer, who explored the two continents. However, Bristol antiquarian Alfred Hudd suggested in 1908 that the name was derived from the surname "Amerike" or "ap Meryk" and was used on early British maps that have since been lost. Richard ap Meryk, anglicised to Richard Amerike, was a wealthy Anglo-Welsh merchant, royal customs officer and sheriff of Bristol. According to some writers, he was the principal owner of the Matthew, the ship sailed by John Cabot during his voyage of exploration to North America in 1497. The idea that Richard Amerike was a 'principal supporter' of Cabot has gained popular currency in the 21st century. There is no evidence to support this. Similarly, and contrary to a recent tradition that names Amerike as principal owner and main funder of the Matthew, Cabot's ship of 1497, academic enquiry does not connect Amerike with the ship. Her ownership at that date remains uncertain. Macdonald asserts that the caravel was specifically built for the Atlantic crossing.

The feminine form America was originally used to refer to the newly discovered continent, which is why it was accorded with the feminine names of the other continents: Asia, Africa, and Europa.

Since the 1950s, however, North America and South America have generally been considered by English speakers as separate continents, and taken together are called the Americas, or more rarely America. (Note: The singular form "America" is more common in the Spanish language, spoken by the majority in 16 out of the 21 mainland countries of North and South America. This was notably demonstrated to English-language audiences during Puerto Rican musician Bad Bunny's pan-Americanist performance at the Super Bowl LX halftime show.) When conceived as a unitary continent, the form is generally the continent of America in the singular. However, without a clarifying context, singular America in English commonly refers to the United States of America.

== Terminology ==
Subdivisions of the Americas
Map	Legend
	North America (NA) South America (SA) May be included in either NA or SA
	North America (NA) May be included in NA Central America Caribbean South America
	North America (NA) May be included in NA Northern America Middle America (MA) Caribbean (may be included in MA) South America (SA) May be included in MA or SA
	Anglo-America (A-A) May be included in A-A or in LA Latin America (LA) May be included in LA

=== History ===
The region was initially termed America or New India on the Mercator maps.

=== English ===
Speakers of English generally refer to the landmasses of North America and South America as the Americas, the Western Hemisphere, or the New World. The adjective American may be used to indicate something pertaining to the Americas, but this term is primarily used in English to indicate something pertaining to the United States. Some non-ambiguous alternatives exist, such as the adjective Pan-American, or New Worlder as a demonym for a resident of the closely related New World. Use of America in the hemispherical sense is sometimes retained, or can occur when translated from other languages. For example, the Association of National Olympic Committees (ANOC) in Paris maintains a single continental association for "America", represented by one of the five Olympic rings.

American essayist H. L. Mencken said, "The Latin-Americans use Norteamericano in formal writing, but, save in Panama, prefer nicknames in colloquial speech." To avoid "American" one can use constructed terms in their languages derived from "United States" or even "North America". In Canada, its southern neighbor is often referred to as "the United States", "the U.S.A.", or (informally) "the States", while U.S. citizens are generally referred to as "Americans". Most Canadians resent being referred to as "Americans".

=== Spanish ===
In Spanish, América is a single continent composed of the subcontinents of América del Sur and América del Norte, the land bridge of América Central, and the islands of the Antillas. Americano or americana in Spanish refers to a person from América in a similar way that in which europeo or europea refers to a person from Europa. The terms sudamericano/a, centroamericano/a, antillano/a and norteamericano/a can be used to more specifically refer to the location where a person may live.

Citizens of the United States of America are normally referred to by the terms estadounidense and estadunidense(rough literal translation: "United Statesian") instead of americano or americana which is discouraged, and the country's name itself is officially translated as Estados Unidos de América (United States of America), commonly abbreviated as Estados Unidos (EE. UU.). Also, the term norteamericano (North American) may refer to a citizen of the United States, though in formal writing it is less common since it is used for the inhabitants of North America.

=== Portuguese ===
In Portuguese, América is a single continent composed of América do Sul (South America), América Central (Central America) and América do Norte (North America). It can be ambiguous, as América can be used to refer to the United States of America, but is avoided in print and formal environments. The demonym 'American' (americano) is commonly used in Portuguese to refer to people from the United States, although the terms 'norte-americano', 'estadounidense' or 'estadunidense' also formally exist and are preferred by those who wish to distinguish it from the continental demonym.

=== French ===
In French, the word américain may be used for things relating to the Americas; however, similar to English, it is most often used for things relating to the United States, with the term états-unien sometimes used for clarity. Panaméricain may be used as an adjective to refer to the Americas without ambiguity. French speakers may use the noun Amérique to refer to the whole landmass as one continent, or two continents, Amérique du Nord and Amérique du Sud. In French, Amérique is seldom used to refer to the United States, leading to some ambiguity when it is. Similar to English usage, les Amériques or des Amériques is used to refer unambiguously to the Americas.

=== Dutch ===
In Dutch, the word Amerika mostly refers to the United States. Although the United States is equally often referred to as de Verenigde Staten ("the United States") or de VS ("the US"), Amerika relatively rarely refers to the Americas, but it is the only commonly used Dutch word for the Americas. This often leads to ambiguity; and to stress that something concerns the Americas as a whole, Dutch uses a combination, namely Noord- en Zuid-Amerika (North and South America).

Latin America and Central America are generally referred to as Latijns Amerika and Midden-Amerika respectively.

The adjective Amerikaans is most often used for things or people relating to the United States. There are no alternative words to distinguish between things relating to the United States or to the Americas. Dutch uses the local alternative for things relating to elsewhere in the Americas, such as Argentijns for Argentine, etc.

== History ==
=== Pre-Columbian era ===
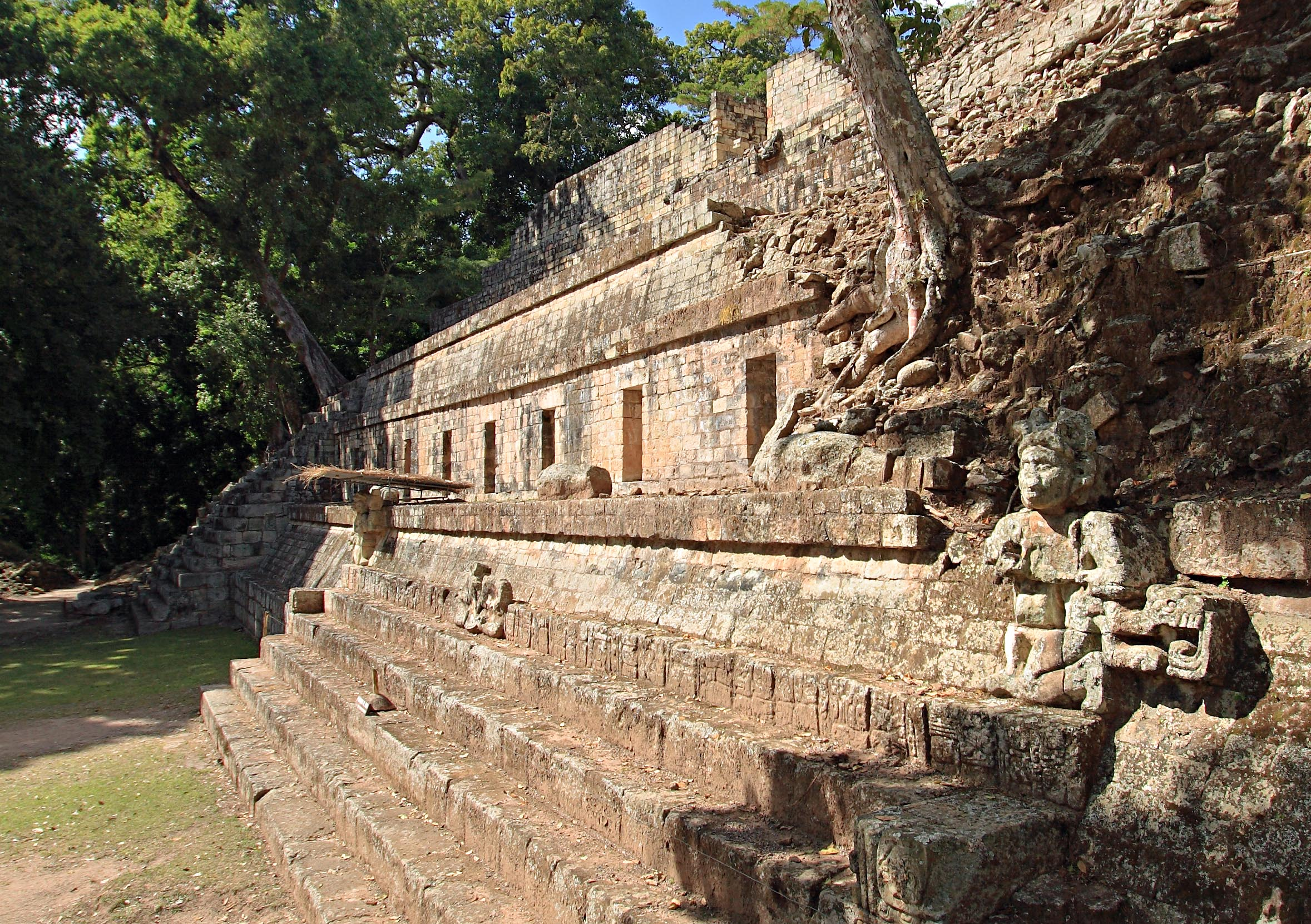
The Plaza Occidental in Copán, Honduras

The pre-Columbian era incorporates all period subdivisions in the history and prehistory of the Americas before the appearance of significant European influences on the American continents, spanning the time of the original settlement in the Upper Paleolithic to European colonization during the early modern period. The term pre-Columbian is used especially often in the context of the great indigenous civilizations of the Americas, such as those of Mesoamerica (Olmec, Toltec, Teotihuacano, Zapotec, Mixtec, Aztec, Maya) and the Andean civilizations (Inca, Moche, Chavín, Muisca, Cañari).

Many pre-Columbian civilizations established characteristics and hallmarks which included permanent or urban settlements, agriculture, civic and monumental architecture, and complex societal hierarchies. Some of these civilizations had long faded by the time of the first permanent European arrivals (c. late 15th–early 16th centuries), and are known only through archeological investigations. Others were contemporary with this period, and are also known from historical accounts of the time. A few, such as the Maya, had their own written records. However, most Europeans of the time viewed such texts as pagan, and much was destroyed in Christian pyres. Only a few hidden documents remain today, leaving modern historians with glimpses of ancient culture and knowledge.

==== Settlement ====
Map of early human migrations based on the Out of Africa theory

The first inhabitants migrated into the Americas from Asia. Habitation sites are known in Alaska and Yukon from at least 20,000 years ago, with suggested ages of up to 40,000 years. Beyond that, the specifics of the Paleo-Indian migration to and throughout the Americas, including the dates and routes traveled, are subject to ongoing research and discussion. Widespread habitation of the Americas occurred after the Late Glacial Maximum, from 16,000 to 13,000 years ago.

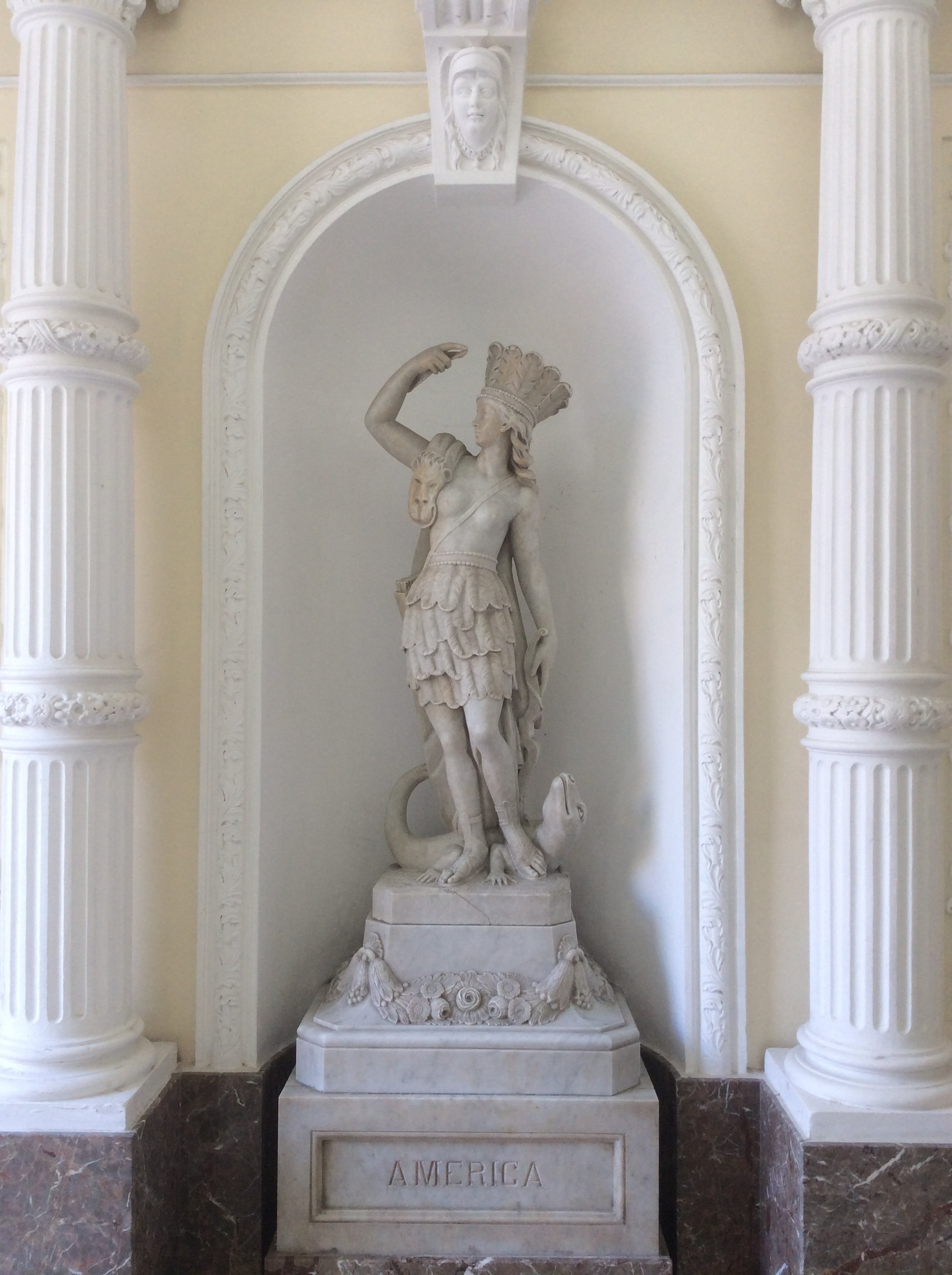
Statue representing the Americas at Palazzo Ferreria, in Valletta, Malta

The traditional theory has been that these early migrants moved into the Beringia land bridge between eastern Siberia and present-day Alaska about 40,000–17,000 years ago, when sea levels were significantly lowered during the Quaternary glaciation. These people are believed to have followed herds of now-extinct pleistocene megafauna along ice-free corridors that stretched between the Laurentide and Cordilleran ice sheets. Another route proposed is that, either on foot or using primitive boats, they migrated down the Pacific coast to South America. Evidence of the latter would since have been covered by a sea level rise of hundreds of meters following the last ice age. Both routes may have been taken, although the genetic evidences suggests a single founding population. The micro-satellite diversity and distributions specific to South American Indigenous peoples indicates that certain populations have been isolated since the initial colonization of the region.

A second migration occurred after the initial peopling of the Americas; Na Dene speakers, found predominantly in North American groups at varying genetic rates, with the highest frequency found among the Athabaskans at 42%, derive from this second wave. Linguists and biologists have reached a similar conclusion based on analysis of Amerindian language groups and ABO blood group system distributions. Then the people of the Arctic small tool tradition, a broad cultural entity that developed along the Alaska Peninsula, around Bristol Bay, and on the eastern shores of the Bering Strait c. 2500 BCE, moved into North America. The Arctic small tool tradition, a Paleo-Eskimo culture, branched off into two cultural variants, including the Pre-Dorset and the Independence traditions of Greenland. The descendants of the Pre-Dorset cultural group, the Dorset culture, were displaced by the final migrants from the Bering sea coast line, the Thule people (the ancestors of modern Inuit), by 1000 CE.

==== Norse colonization ====
Around the same time as the Inuit migrated into Greenland, Viking settlers began arriving in Greenland in 982 and Vinland shortly thereafter, establishing a settlement at L'Anse aux Meadows, near the northernmost tip of Newfoundland. Contact between the Norse colonies and Europe was maintained, as James Watson Curran states:

From 985 to 1410, Greenland was in touch with the world. Then silence. In 1492 the Vatican noted that no news of that country "at the end of the world" had been received for 80 years, and the bishopric of the colony was offered to a certain ecclesiastic if he would go and "restore Christianity" there. He didn't go.

=== Large-scale European colonization ===
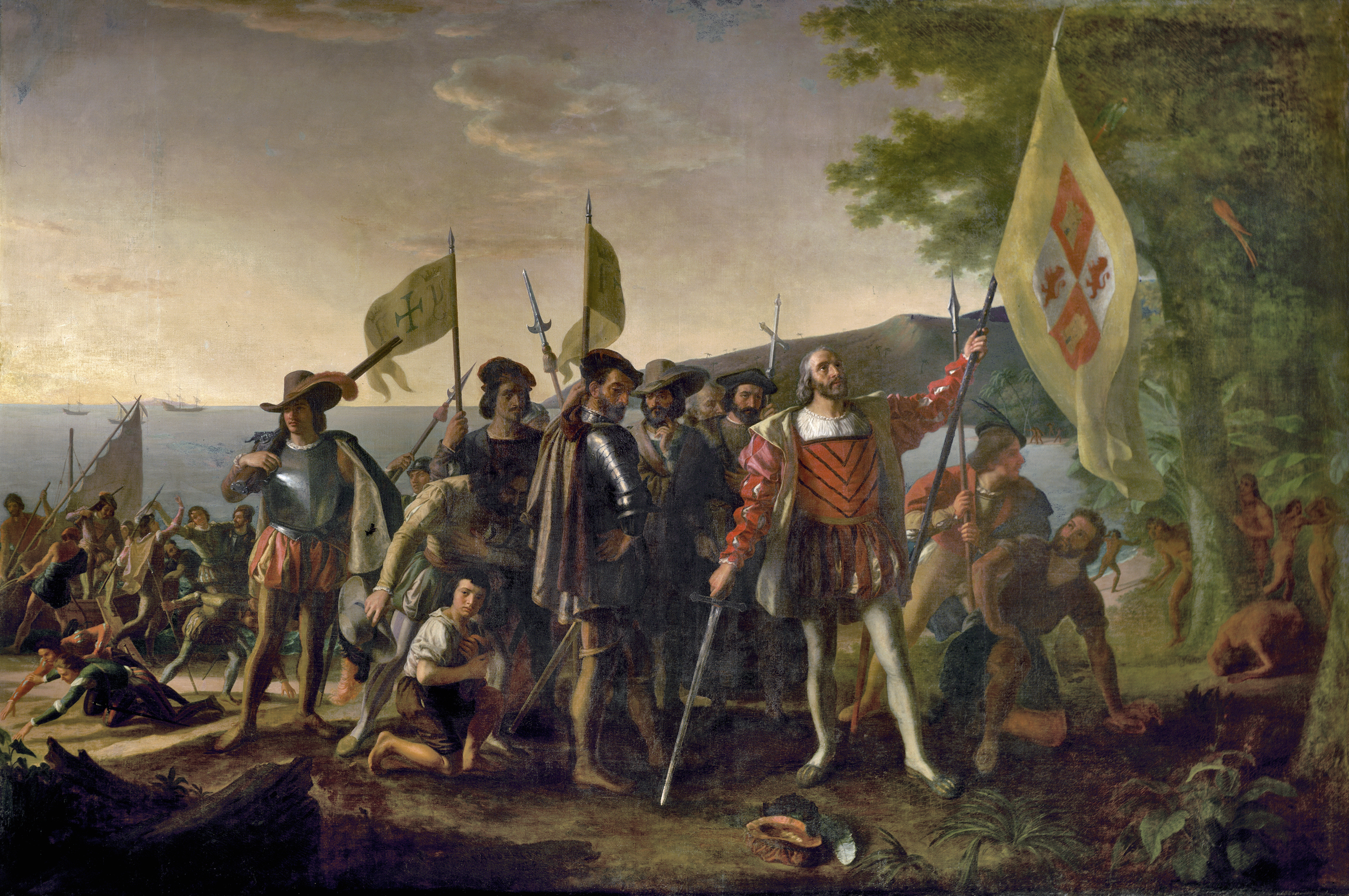
Landing of Columbus by John Vanderlyn, 1847. Christopher Columbus leads expedition to the New World, 1492.

Although there had been previous trans-oceanic contact, large-scale European colonization of the Americas began with the first voyage of Christopher Columbus in 1492. The first Spanish settlement in the Americas was La Isabela in northern Hispaniola. This town was abandoned shortly after in favor of Santo Domingo de Guzmán, founded in 1496, the oldest American city of European foundation. This was the base from which the Spanish monarchy administered its new colonies and their expansion. Santo Domingo was subject to frequent raids by English and French pirates.

On the continent, Panama City on the Pacific coast of Central America, founded on August 15, 1519, played an important role, being the base for the Spanish conquest of South America. Conquistador Lucas Vázquez de Ayllón established San Miguel de Guadalupe, the first European settlement in what is now the United States, on the Pee Dee River in South Carolina. During the first half of the 16th century, Spanish colonists conducted raids throughout the Caribbean Basin, bringing captives from Central America, northern South America, and Florida back to Hispaniola and other Spanish settlements.

France, led by Jacques Cartier and Giovanni da Verrazzano, focused primarily on North America. English explorations of the Americas were led by Giovanni Caboto and Sir Walter Raleigh. The Dutch in New Netherland confined their operations to Manhattan Island, Long Island, the Hudson River Valley, and what later became New Jersey. The spread of new diseases brought by Europeans and African slaves killed many of the inhabitants of North America and South America, with a general population crash of Native Americans occurring in the mid-16th century, often well ahead of European contact. One of the most devastating diseases was smallpox.

European immigrants were often part of state-sponsored attempts to found colonies in the Americas. Migration continued as people moved to the Americas fleeing religious persecution or seeking economic opportunities. Millions of individuals were forcibly transported to the Americas as slaves, prisoners or indentured servants.

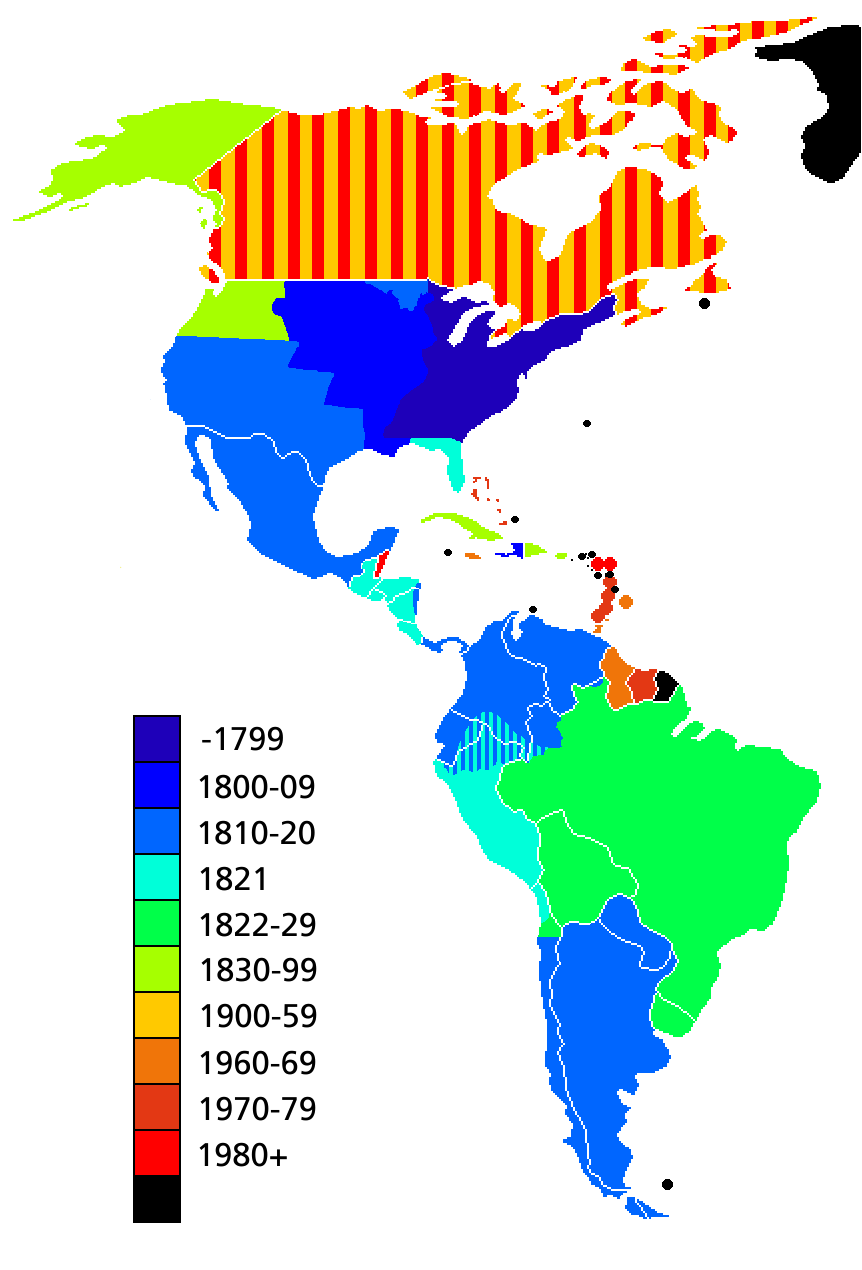
Map showing the dates of independence from European powers. Black signifies areas that are dependent territories or parts of countries with a capital outside the Americas.

Decolonization of the Americas began with the American Revolution and the Haitian Revolution in the late 1700s. This was followed by numerous Latin American wars of independence in the early 1800s. Between 1811 and 1825, Paraguay, Argentina, Chile, Gran Colombia, the United Provinces of Central America, Mexico, Brazil, Peru, and Bolivia gained independence from Spain and Portugal in armed revolutions. After the Dominican Republic won independence from Haiti, it was re-annexed by Spain in 1861, but reclaimed its independence in 1865 at the conclusion of the Dominican Restoration War. The last violent episode of decolonization was the Cuban War of Independence which became the Spanish–American War, which resulted in the independence of Cuba in 1898, and the transfer of sovereignty over Puerto Rico from Spain to the United States.

Peaceful decolonization began with the United States' purchase of Louisiana from France in 1803, Florida from Spain in 1819, Alaska from Russia in 1867, and the Danish West Indies from Denmark in 1916. Canada became independent of the United Kingdom, starting with the Balfour Declaration of 1926 and the Statute of Westminster 1931 and ending with the patriation of the Canadian Constitution in 1982. The Dominion of Newfoundland similarly achieved independence under the Balfour Declaration and Statute of Westminster, but relinquished self-rule in 1934. It was subsequently confederated with Canada in 1949.

The remaining European colonies in the Caribbean began to achieve peaceful independence well after World War II. Jamaica and Trinidad and Tobago became independent in 1962, and Guyana and Barbados both achieved independence in 1966. In the 1970s, the Bahamas, Grenada, Dominica, St. Lucia, and St. Vincent and the Grenadines all became independent of the United Kingdom, and Suriname became independent of the Netherlands. Belize, Antigua and Barbuda, and Saint Kitts and Nevis achieved independence from the United Kingdom in the 1980s.

== Geography ==
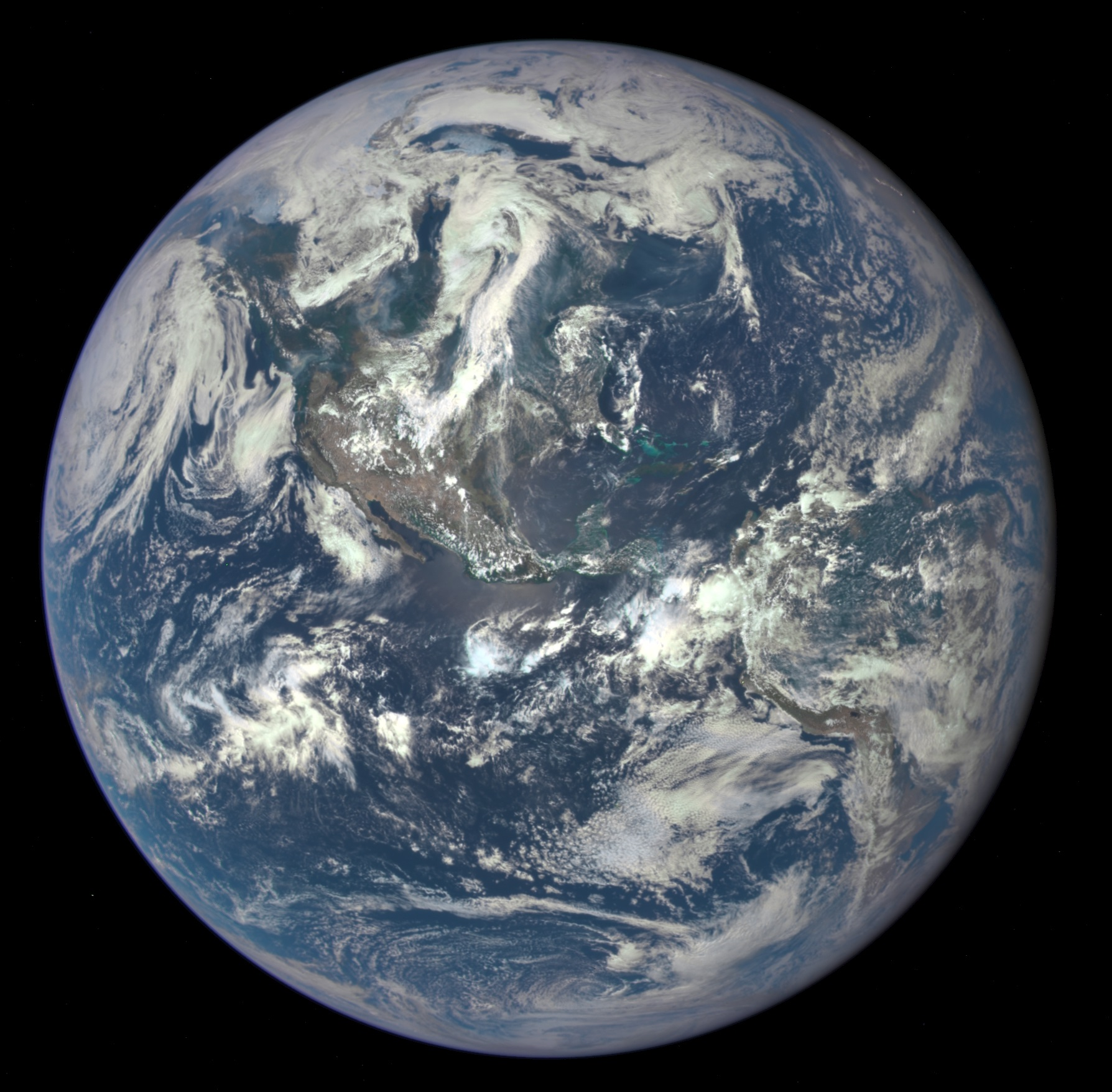
Satellite photo of the Americas on Earth

=== Extent ===
The Americas make up most of the land in Earth's Western Hemisphere. The northernmost point of the Americas is Kaffeklubben Island, which is the most northerly point of land on Earth. The southernmost undisputed point is Águila Islet, although the Antarctic islands of Southern Thule are sometimes taken into account. The mainland of the Americas is the world's longest north-to-south landmass. The distance between its two polar extremities, Murchison Promontory on the Boothia Peninsula in northern Canada and Cape Froward in Chilean Patagonia, is roughly 14,000 km (8,700 mi). The mainland's most westerly point is the end of the Seward Peninsula in Alaska; Attu Island, further off the Alaskan coast to the west, is considered the westernmost point of the Americas. Ponta do Seixas in northeastern Brazil forms the easternmost extremity of the mainland, while Nordostrundingen, in Greenland, is the most easterly point of the continental shelf.

=== Geology ===
South America broke off from the west of the supercontinent Gondwana about 135 million years ago, forming its own continent. About 15 million years ago, the collision of the Caribbean Plate and the Pacific Plate resulted in the emergence of a series of volcanoes along the border that created a number of islands. The gaps in the archipelago of Central America filled in with material eroded off North America and South America, plus new land created by continued volcanism. By three million years ago, the continents of North America and South America were linked by the Isthmus of Panama, thereby forming the single landmass of the Americas. The Great American Interchange resulted in many species being spread across the Americas, such as the cougar, procyonids, porcupines, opossums, armadillos, and hummingbirds.

=== Topography ===
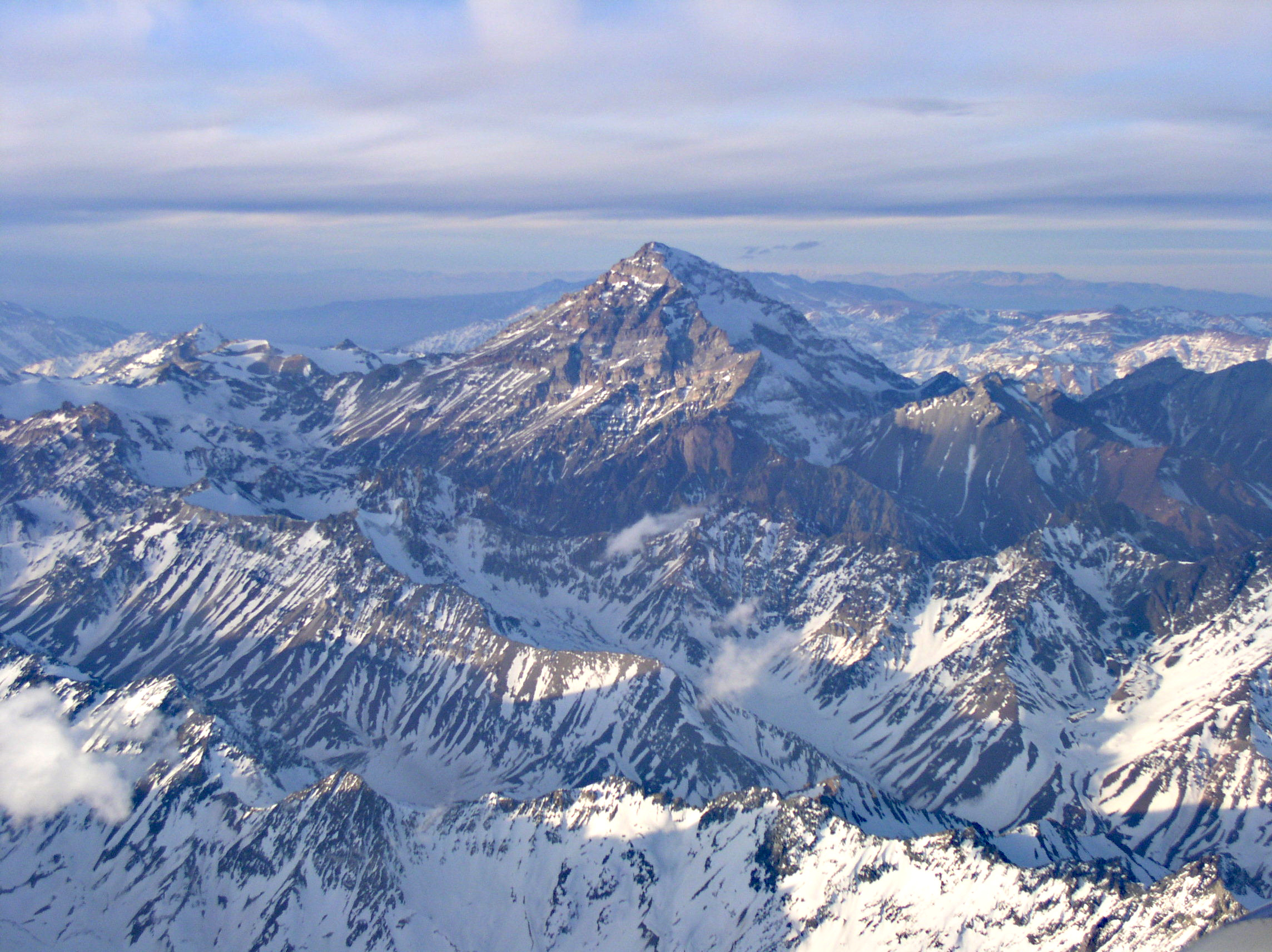
Aconcagua, in Argentina, is the highest peak in the Americas.

The geography of the western Americas is dominated by the American Cordillera, with the Andes running along the west coast of South America and the Rocky Mountains and other North American Cordillera ranges running along the western side of North America. The 2,300-kilometer-long (1,400 mi) Appalachian Mountains run along the east coast of North America from Alabama to Newfoundland. North of the Appalachians, the Arctic Cordillera runs along the eastern coast of Canada.

The largest mountain ranges are the Andes and Rocky Mountains. The Sierra Nevada and the Cascade Range reach similar altitudes as the Rocky Mountains, but are significantly smaller. In North America, the greatest number of fourteeners are in the United States, and more specifically in the US state of Colorado. The highest peaks of the Americas are located in the Andes, with Aconcagua of Argentina being the highest; in North America Denali (Mount McKinley) in the US state of Alaska is the tallest.

Between its coastal mountain ranges, North America has vast flat areas. The Interior Plains spread over much of the continent, with low relief. The Canadian Shield covers almost 5 million km^{2} of North America and is generally quite flat. Similarly, the north-east of South America is covered by the flat Amazon basin. The Brazilian Highlands on the east coast are fairly smooth but show some variations in landform, while farther south the Gran Chaco and Pampas are broad lowlands.

=== Climate ===
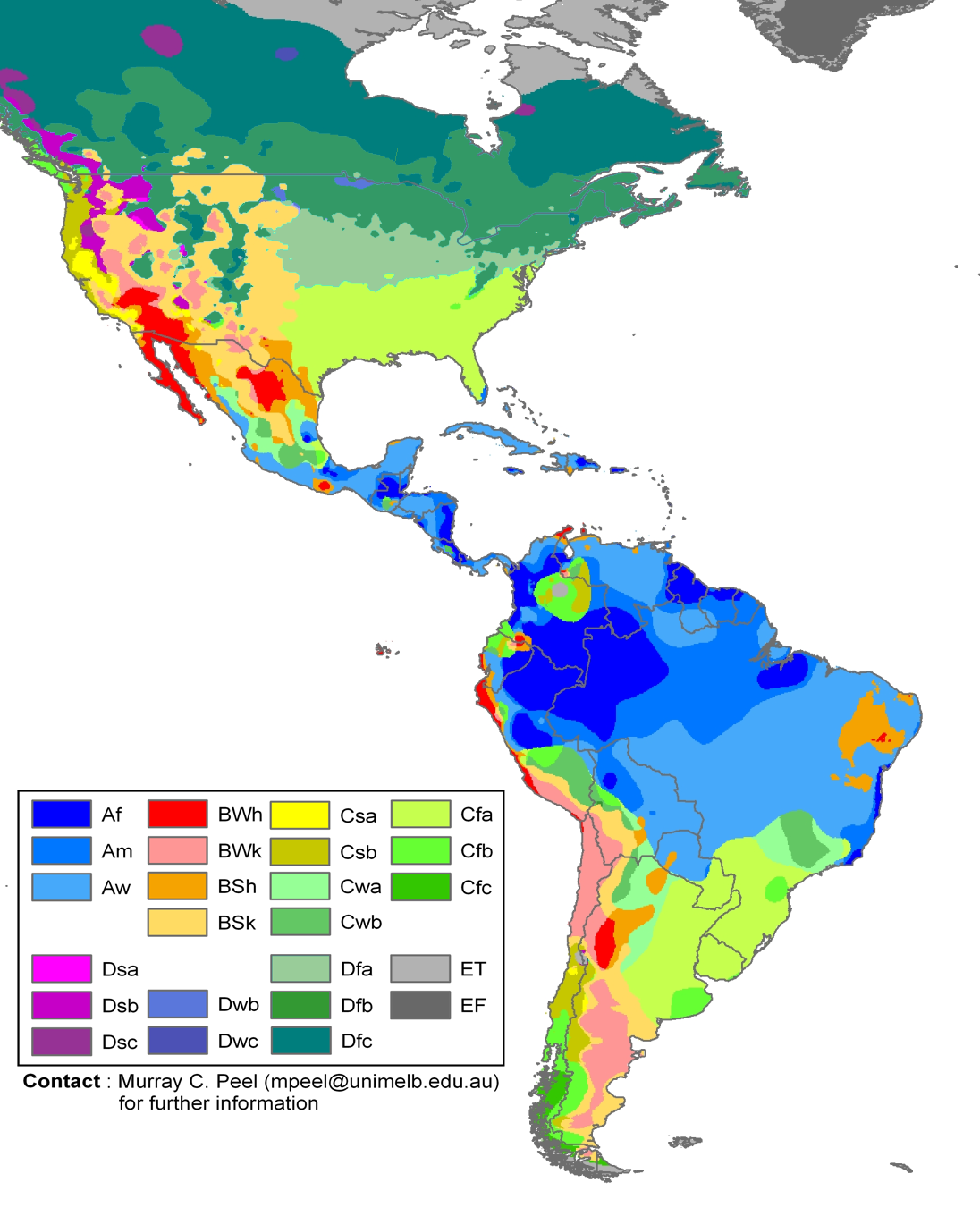
Climate zones of the Americas in the Köppen climate classification system

The climate of the Americas varies significantly from region to region. Tropical rainforest climate occurs in the latitudes of the Amazon, American cloud forests, southeastern Florida and Darién Gap. In the Rocky Mountains and Andes, dry and continental climates are observed. Often the higher altitudes of these mountains are snow-capped.

Southeastern North America is well known for its occurrence of tornadoes and hurricanes, of which the vast majority of tornadoes occur in the United States' Tornado Alley, as well as in the southerly Dixie Alley in the North American late-winter and early spring seasons. Often parts of the Caribbean are exposed to the violent effects of hurricanes. These weather systems are formed by the collision of dry, cool air from Canada and wet, warm air from the Atlantic.

=== Hydrology ===
With coastal mountains and interior plains, the Americas have several large river basins that drain the continents. The largest river basin in North America is that of the Mississippi, covering the second-largest watershed on the planet. The Mississippi–Missouri river system drains most of 31 states of the United States, most of the Great Plains, and large areas between the Rocky and Appalachian mountains. The Mississippi–Missouri is the fourth-longest river system and has the tenth-greatest discharge in the world.

In North America, to the east of the Appalachian Mountains, there are no major rivers but rather a series of rivers and streams that flow east with their terminus in the Atlantic Ocean, such as the Hudson, Saint John, and Savannah rivers. A similar instance arises with central Canadian rivers that drain into Hudson Bay; the largest being the Churchill River. On the west coast of North America, the main rivers are the Colorado, Columbia, Yukon, Fraser, and Sacramento rivers.

The Colorado River drains much of the Southern Rockies and parts of the Basin and Range Province. The river flows approximately 1,450 miles (2,330 km) into the Gulf of California, during which over time it has carved out natural phenomena such as the Grand Canyon and created phenomena such as the Salton Sea. The Columbia is a large river, 1,243 miles (2,000 km) long, in central western North America and is the most powerful river on the West Coast of the Americas. In the far northwest of North America, the Yukon drains much of the Alaskan peninsula and flows 1,980 miles (3,190 km) from parts of Yukon and the Northwest Territory to the Pacific. Draining to the Arctic Ocean of Canada, the Mackenzie River drains waters from the Arctic Great Lakes of Arctic Canada, as opposed to the St Lawrence River that drains the Great Lakes of southern Canada into the Atlantic Ocean. The Mackenzie River is the largest in Canada and drains 1,805,200 km^{2} (697,000 mi^{2}).

The largest river basin in South America is that of the Amazon, which has the highest volume flow of any river on Earth. The second largest watershed of South America is that of the Paraná River, which covers about 2,582,074 km^{2} (996,944 mi^{2}).

=== Ecology ===
North America and South America began to develop a shared population of flora and fauna about 2.5 million years ago, when continental drift brought the two continents into contact via the Isthmus of Panama. Initially, the exchange of biota was roughly equal, with North American genera migrating into South America in about the same proportions as South American genera migrated into North America. This exchange is known as the Great American Interchange. The exchange became lopsided after roughly a million years, with the total spread of South American genera into North America far more limited in scope than the spread of North American genera into South America.

== Countries and territories ==
There are 35 sovereign states in the Americas, as well as an autonomous country of Denmark, three overseas departments of France, three overseas collectivities of France, and one uninhabited territory of France, eight overseas territories of the United Kingdom, three constituent countries of the Netherlands, three public bodies of the Netherlands, two unincorporated territories of the United States, and one uninhabited territory of the United States.

Country or territory	Total area (km^{2})	Population (Note: See list of countries by population for references.)	Pop. density (per km^{2})	Common languages (official in bold)	Capital
Anguilla (United Kingdom)	91	13,452	164.8	**English**	The Valley
Antigua and Barbuda	442	86,295	199.1	Creole, English	St. John's
Argentina	2,766,890	42,669,500	14.3	Spanish	Buenos Aires
Aruba (Netherlands)	180	101,484	594.4	**Papiamentu**, Spanish, **Dutch**	Oranjestad
The Bahamas	13,943	351,461	24.5	Creole, **English**	Nassau
Bajo Nuevo Bank (United States / Colombia / Jamaica)	100	0	0.0	Uninhabited	N/A
Barbados	430	285,000	595.3	Bajan, **English**	Bridgetown
Belize	22,966	349,728	13.4	Spanish, Kriol, **English**	Belmopan
Bermuda (United Kingdom)	54	64,237	1,203.7	**English**	Hamilton
Bolivia	1,098,580	10,027,254	8.4	**Spanish** and **36 indigenous languages**	La Paz and Sucre
Bonaire (Netherlands)	294	12,093	41.1	**Papiamentu**, Spanish, **Dutch**	Kralendijk
Brazil	8,514,877	203,106,000	23.6	**Portuguese** (Note: According to Article 13 of the Constitution: A língua portuguesa é o idioma oficial da República Federativa do Brasil ("The Portuguese language is the official language of the Federative Republic of Brazil"). Brazilian Sign Language is also officially recognized and protected. 95 municipalities and 3 Brazilian states also have co-official languages, with 61 co-officialized languages. The list can be seen at Languages of Brazil.)	Brasília
British Virgin Islands (United Kingdom)	151	29,537	152.3	**English**	Road Town
Canada	9,984,670	41,548,787	3.8	**English**, **French**	Ottawa
Cayman Islands (United Kingdom)	264	81,546	212.1	**English**	George Town
Chile	756,950	17,773,000	22	Spanish	Santiago
Clipperton Island (France)	6	0	0.0	Uninhabited	N/A
Colombia	1,138,910	47,757,000	40	**Spanish**	Bogotá
Costa Rica	51,180	4,667,096	89.6	**Spanish**	San José
Cuba	109,886	11,167,325	102.0	**Spanish**	Havana
Curaçao (Netherlands)	444	150,563	317.1	Papiamentu, **Dutch**	Willemstad
Dominica	751	71,293	89.2	French Patois, **English**	Roseau
Dominican Republic	48,671	10,378,267	207.3	**Spanish**	Santo Domingo
Ecuador	283,560	15,819,400	53.8	**Spanish**, Quechua	Quito
El Salvador	21,041	6,401,240	293.0	**Spanish**	San Salvador
Falkland Islands (United Kingdom)	12,173	3,000	0.26	**English**	Stanley
Federal Dependencies of Venezuela (Venezuela)	342	2,155	2.4	**Spanish**	N/A
French Guiana (France)	91,000	237,549	2.7	**French**	Cayenne
Greenland (Denmark)	2,166,086	56,483	0.026	**Greenlandic**, Danish	Nuuk
Grenada	344	103,328	302.3	**English**	St. George's
Guadeloupe (France)	1,628	405,739	246.7	**Guadeloupean Creole, French**	Basse-Terre
Guatemala	108,889	15,806,675	128.8	**Spanish**, Garifuna and 23 Mayan languages	Guatemala City
Guyana	214,999	784,894	3.5	**English**	Georgetown
Haiti	27,750	10,745,665	361.5	**Creole**, **French**	Port-au-Prince
Honduras	112,492	8,555,072	66.4	**Spanish**	Tegucigalpa
Jamaica	10,991	2,717,991	247.4	Patois, **English**	Kingston
Martinique (France)	1,128	392,291	352.6	Patois, **French**	Fort-de-France
Mexico	1,964,375	119,713,203	57.1	**Spanish, 68 indigenous languages**	Mexico City
Montserrat (United Kingdom)	102	4,922	58.8	Creole English, **English**	Plymouth; Brades
Navassa Island (United States / Haiti)	5	0	0.0	Uninhabited	Lulu Town
Nicaragua	130,373	6,071,045	44.1	**Spanish**	Managua
Panama	75,417	3,405,813	45.8	**Spanish**	Panama City
Paraguay	406,750	6,783,374	15.6	**Guaraní**, **Spanish**	Asunción
Peru	1,285,220	30,814,175	22	**Spanish, Quechua, and other indigenous languages**	Lima
Puerto Rico (United States)	8,870	3,615,086	448.9	**Spanish**, **English**	San Juan
Saba (Netherlands)	13	1,537	118.2	English, **Dutch**	The Bottom
Saint Barthélemy (France)	21	8,938	354.7	**French**	Gustavia
Saint Kitts and Nevis	261	55,000	199.2	**English**	Basseterre
Saint Lucia	539	180,000	319.1	**English**, French Creole	Castries
Saint Martin (France)	54	36,979	552.2	**French**	Marigot
Saint Pierre and Miquelon (France)	242	6,081	24.8	**French**	Saint-Pierre
Saint Vincent and the Grenadines	389	109,000	280.2	**English**	Kingstown
Serranilla Bank (United States / Colombia / Honduras)	100	0	0.0	Uninhabited	N/A
Sint Eustatius (Netherlands)	21	2,739	130.4	**Dutch**, **English**	Oranjestad
Sint Maarten (Netherlands)	34	37,429	1,176.7	**English**, Spanish, **Dutch**	Philipsburg
(South Georgia and the South Sandwich Islands) South Georgia and South Sandwich Islands (United Kingdom)	3,093	20	0.01	**English**	King Edward Point
Suriname	163,270	534,189	3	**Dutch** and others	Paramaribo
Trinidad and Tobago	5,130	1,328,019	261.0	**English**	Port of Spain
Turks and Caicos Islands (United Kingdom)	948	31,458	34.8	Creole English, **English**	Cockburn Town
United States of America (Note: Includes the states of Hawaii and Alaska, which are both separated from the US mainland, with Hawaii distant from the North American landmass in the Pacific Ocean and therefore more commonly associated with the other territories of Oceania, while Alaska is located between Canada and Asia (Russia).)	9,629,091	320,206,000	34.2	**English**, Spanish	Washington, D.C.
U.S. Virgin Islands (United States)	347	106,405	317.0	English	Charlotte Amalie
Uruguay	176,220	3,286,314	19.4	**Spanish**	Montevideo
Venezuela	916,445	30,206,307	30.2	**Spanish and 40 indigenous languages**	Caracas
Total	42,320,985	973,186,925	21.9		

== Economy ==
Rank	Country	GDP (nominal, peak year) millions of USD
1	United States	32,642,373
2	Brazil	2,654,761
3	Canada	2,490,256
4	Mexico	2,176,236
5	Argentina	768,206
6	Colombia	572,735
7	Cuba (2021)	545,218

Rank	Country	GDP (PPP, peak year) millions of USD
1	United States	32,642,373
2	Brazil	5,266,506
3	Mexico	3,594,397
4	Canada	2,915,715
5	Argentina	1,577,460
6	Colombia	1,262,040
7	Chile (2025)	750,190

In exports and imports, in 2020, the United States was the world's second largest exporter (US$1.64 trillion) and the largest importer (US$2.56 trillion). Mexico was the tenth largest exporter and importer. Canada was the twelfth largest exporter and importer. Brazil was the 24th largest exporter and the 28th largest importer. Chile was the 45th largest exporter and the 47th largest importer. Argentina was the 46th largest exporter and the 52nd largest importer. Colombia was the 54th largest exporter and the 51st largest importer; among others.

The agriculture of the continent is very strong and varied. Countries such as United States, Brazil, Canada, Mexico, and Argentina are among the largest agricultural producers on the planet. In 2019, the continent dominated the world production of soy (almost 90% of the world total, with Brazil, the United States, Argentina, Paraguay, Canada and Bolivia among the 10 largest on the planet), sugarcane (about 55% of the world total, with Brazil, Mexico, the United States, and Guatemala among the 10 largest on the planet), coffee (about 55% of the world total, with Brazil, Colombia, Honduras, Peru, and Guatemala among the 10 largest on the planet) and maize (about 48% of the world total, with the United States, Brazil, Argentina, and Mexico among the 10 largest on the planet). The continent also produces almost 40% of world's orange (with Brazil, the United States, and Mexico among the top 10 producers), about 37% of world's pineapple (with Costa Rica, Brazil, Mexico, and Colombia among the 10 largest producers), about 35% of world's lemon (with Mexico, Argentina, Brazil, and the United States among the 10 largest producers) and about 30% of world's cotton (with the United States, Brazil, Mexico and Argentina among the top 10 producers), among several other products.

In livestock, the Americas are major producers. In 2018, the continent produced about 45% of the world's beef (with the United States, Brazil, Argentina, Mexico, and Canada among the world's 10 largest producers); about 36% of the world's chicken meat (with the United States, Brazil, and Mexico among the world's 10 largest producers), and about 28% of the world's cow's milk (with the United States and Brazil among the 10 largest producers in the world), among other products.

In industrial terms, the World Bank lists the top producing countries each year, based on the total value of production. According to the 2019 list, the United States has the second most valuable industry in the world (US$2.3 trillion), Mexico has the 12th most valuable industry in the world (US$217.8 billion), Brazil has the 13th most valuable industry in the world (US$173.6 billion), Canada has the 15th most valuable industry in the world (US$151.7 billion), Venezuela the 30th largest (US$58.2 billion, but depends on the oil to obtain this amount), Argentina was the 31st largest (US$57.7 billion), Colombia the 46th largest (US$35.4 billion), Peru the 50th largest ($28.7 billion), and Chile the 51st largest (US$28.3 billion), among others.

In the production of oil, the continent had 8 of the 30 largest world producers in 2020: United States (1st), Canada (4th), Brazil (8th), Mexico (14th), Colombia (20th), Venezuela (26th), Ecuador (27th), and Argentina (28th).

In the production of natural gas, the continent had 8 of the 32 largest world producers in 2015: United States (1st), Canada (5th), Argentina (18th), Trinidad and Tobago (20th), Mexico (21st), Venezuela (28th), Bolivia (31st), and Brazil (32nd).

In the production of coal, the continent had 5 of the 30 largest world producers in 2018: United States (3rd), Colombia (12th), Canada (13th), Mexico (24th), and Brazil (27th).

In the production of vehicles, the continent had 5 of the 30 largest world producers in 2019: United States (2nd), Mexico (7th), Brazil (9th), Canada (12th), and Argentina (28th).

In the production of steel, the continent had 5 of the 31 largest world producers in 2019: United States (4th), Brazil (9th), Mexico (15th), Canada (18th), and Argentina (31st).

In mining, the continent has large productions of gold (mainly in the United States, Canada, Peru, Mexico, Brazil, and Argentina); silver (mainly in Mexico, Peru, Chile, Bolivia, Argentina, and the United States); copper (mainly in Chile, Peru, the United States, Mexico, and Brazil); platinum (Canada and the United States); iron ore (Brazil, Canada, the United States, Peru, and Chile); zinc (Peru, the United States, Mexico, Bolivia, Canada, and Brazil); molybdenum (Chile, Peru, Mexico, Canada, and the United States); lithium (Chile, Argentina, Brazil, and Canada); lead (Peru, the United States, Mexico, and Bolivia); bauxite (Brazil, Jamaica, Canada, and the United States); tin (Peru, Bolivia, and Brazil); manganese (Brazil and Mexico); antimony (Bolivia, Mexico, Guatemala, Canada, and Ecuador); nickel (Canada, Brazil, Dominican Republic, Cuba, and the United States); niobium (Brazil and Canada); rhenium (Chile and the United States); and iodine (Chile), among others.

Dominica, Panama, and the Dominican Republic have the fastest-growing economy in the Americas according to the International Monetary Fund (IMF), 16, five to seven countries in the southern part of the Americas had weakening economies in decline, compared to only three countries in the northern part of the Americas. Haiti has the lowest GDP per capita in the Americas, although its economy was growing slightly as of 2016.

== Demographics ==
=== Population ===
In 2021 the total population of the Americas was about 1.03 billion people, divided as follows:

- North America: 596.6 million (includes Central America and the Caribbean)
- South America: 434.3 million

=== Largest urban centers ===
There are three urban centers that each hold titles for being the largest population area based on the three main demographic concepts:

- City proper

A city proper is the locality with legally fixed boundaries and an administratively recognized urban status that is usually characterized by some form of local government.

- Urban area

An urban area is characterized by higher population density and vast human features in comparison to areas surrounding it. Urban areas may be cities, towns or conurbations, but the term is not commonly extended to rural settlements such as villages and hamlets. Urban areas are created and further developed by the process of urbanization and do not include large swaths of rural land, as do metropolitan areas.

- Metropolitan area

Unlike an urban area, a metropolitan area includes not only the urban area, but also satellite cities plus intervening rural land that is socio-economically connected to the urban core city, typically by employment ties through commuting, with the urban core city being the primary labor market.

In accordance with these definitions, the three largest population centers in the Americas are: Mexico City, anchor to the largest metropolitan area in the Americas; New York City, anchor to the largest urban area in the Americas; and São Paulo, the largest city proper in the Americas. All three cities maintain Alpha classification and large scale influence.

Urban centers within the Americas

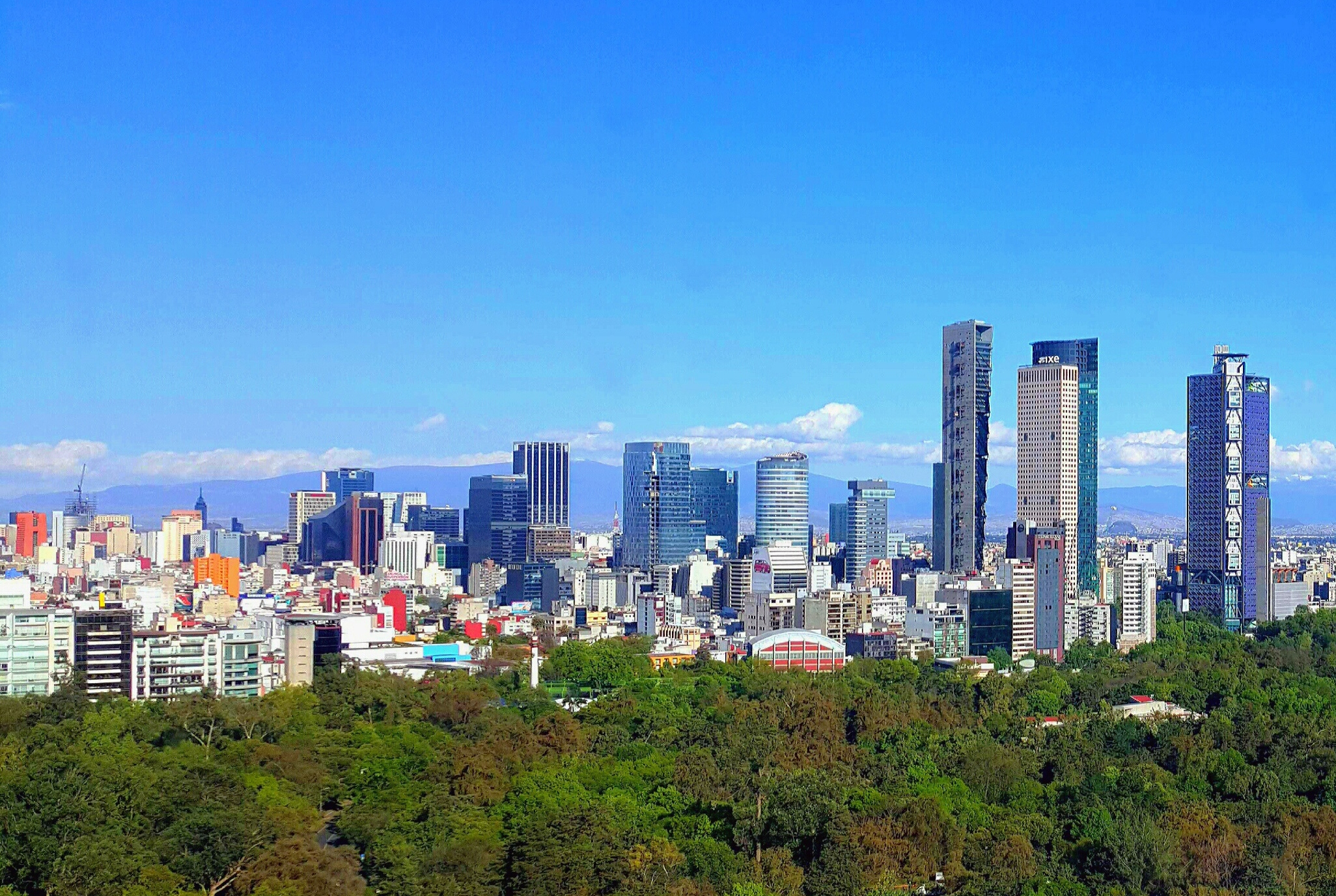
Mexico City – largest metropolitan area in the Americas, with a population of 22,300,000 in 2017

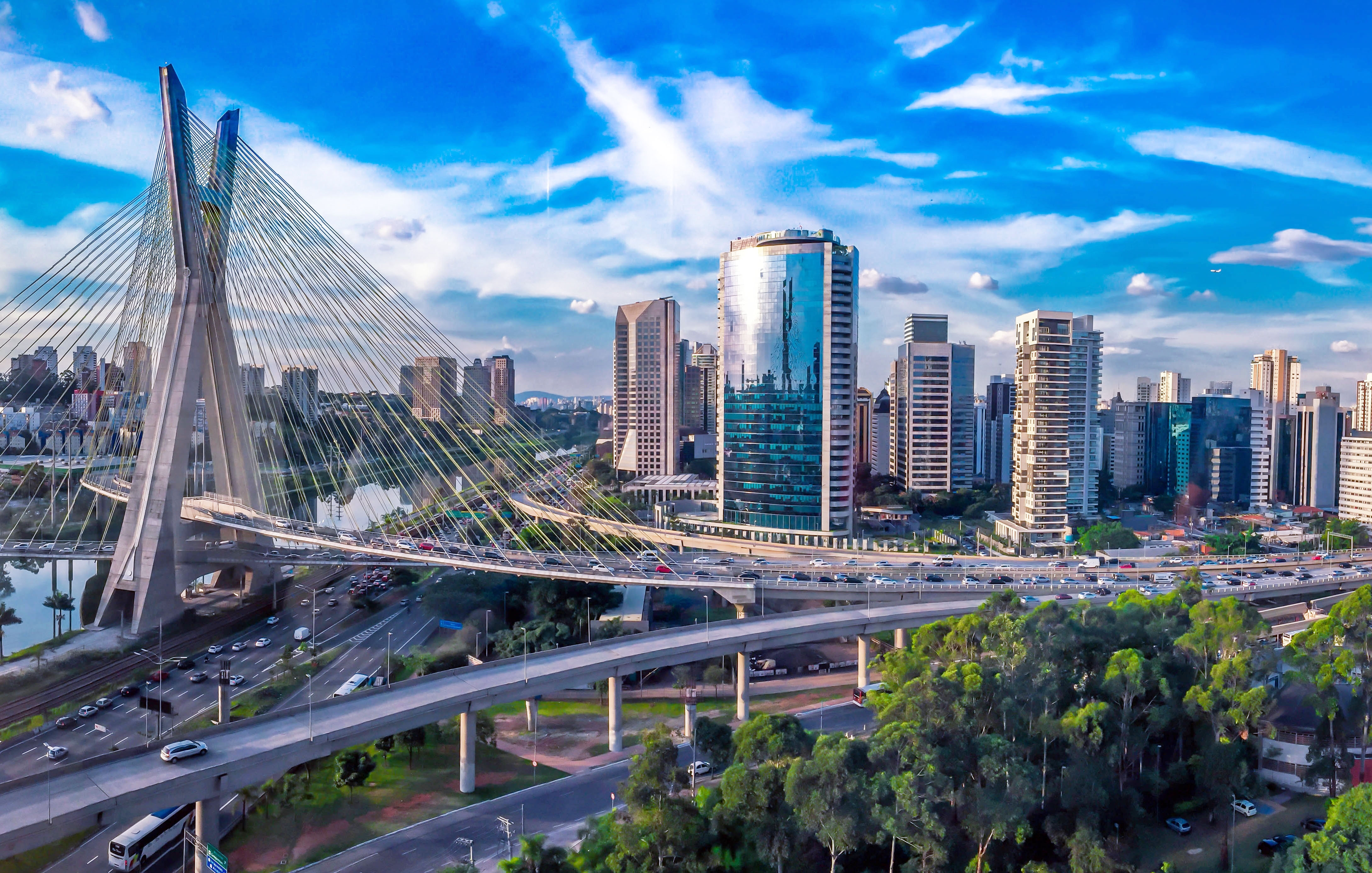
São Paulo – largest city in the Americas, with a population of 12,038,175 (city) in 2016

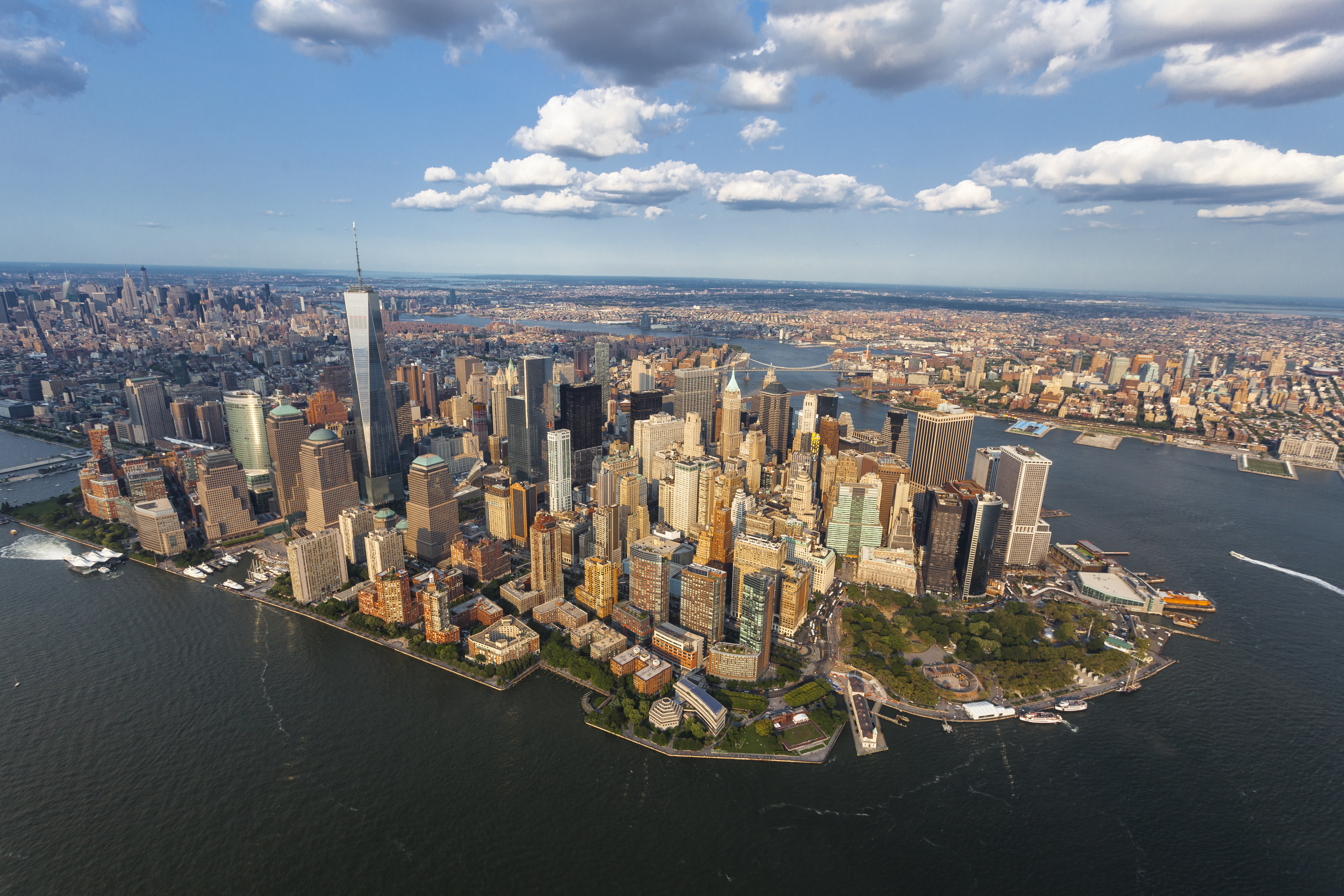
New York City – largest urban area in the Americas, with a population of 18,351,295 in 2010

Country	City	City Population	Metro Area Population
Mexico	Mexico City	9,209,944	21,804,515
Brazil	São Paulo	11,451,999	21,518,955
United States	New York City	8,405,837	19,949,502
Argentina	Buenos Aires	3,121,707	16,366,641
United States	Los Angeles	3,928,864	13,131,431

=== Ethnology ===
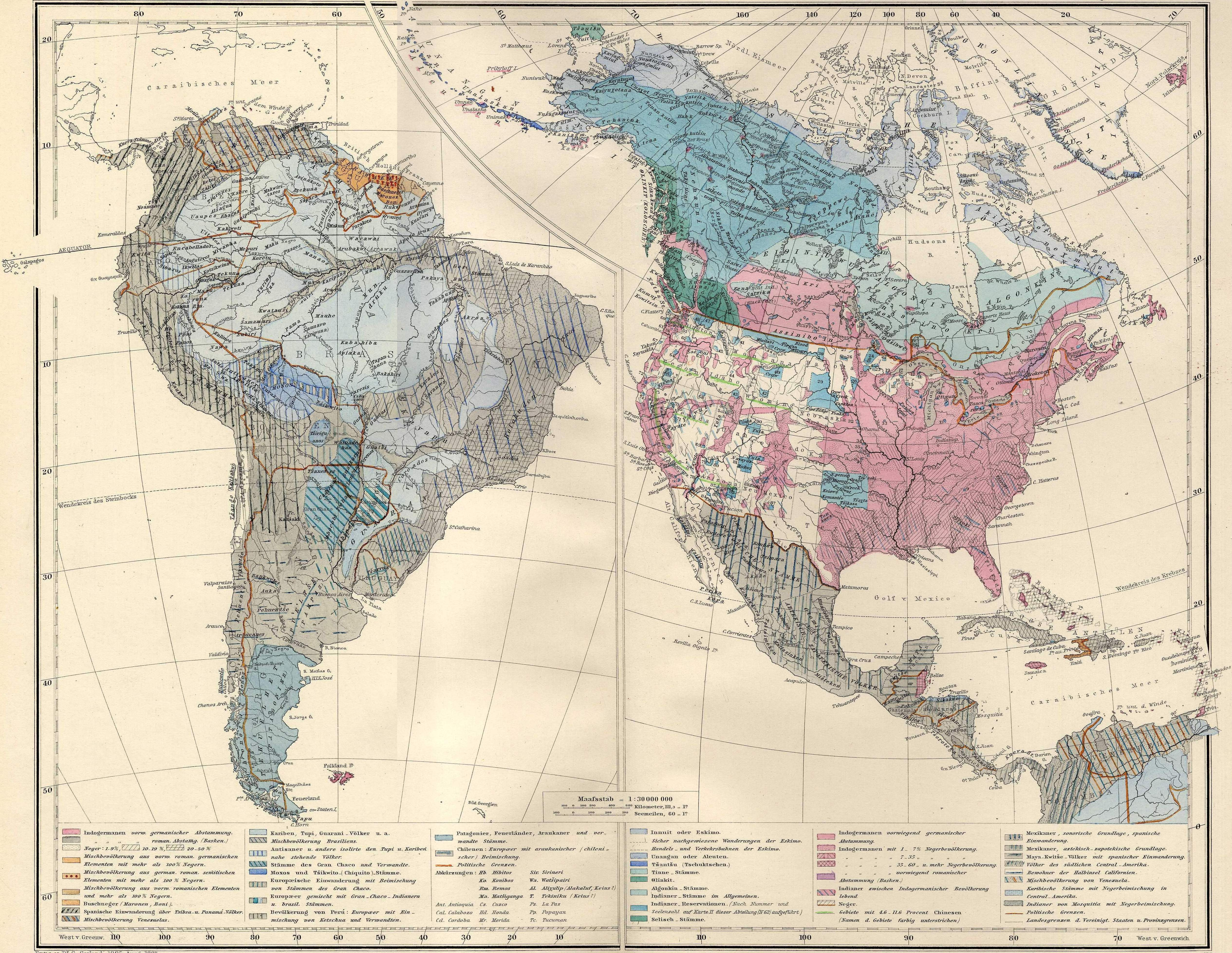
Ethnic map of the Americas (c. 1880) by Heinrich Berghaus

The population of the Americas is made up of the descendants of four large ethnic groups and their combinations.

- The Indigenous peoples of the Americas, being Amerindians and Inuit-Yupik-Unangan.
- Those of European ancestry, mainly Spanish, English, Irish, Portuguese, German, Italian, French, and Dutch.
- Those of African ancestry, mainly of West African descent.
- Asians, that is, those of East Asian, Southeast Asian, and South Asian ancestry.
- Mestizos (Métis people in Canada), those of mixed European and Amerindian ancestry.
- Mulattoes, people of mixed African and European ancestry.
- Zambos (Spanish) or Cafuzos (Portuguese), those of mixed African and Indigenous ancestry.

The majority of the population lives in Latin America, named for its predominant cultures, rooted in Latin Europe (including the two dominant languages, Spanish and Portuguese, both Romance languages), more specifically in the Iberian nations of Portugal and Spain (hence the use of the term Ibero-America as a synonym). Latin America is typically contrasted with Anglo-America, where English, a Germanic language, is prevalent, and which comprises Canada (with the exception of Francophone Canada rooted in Latin Europe [France]—see Quebec and Acadia) and the United States. Both countries are located in North America, with cultures deriving predominantly from British and other Germanic roots.

==== Black population ====
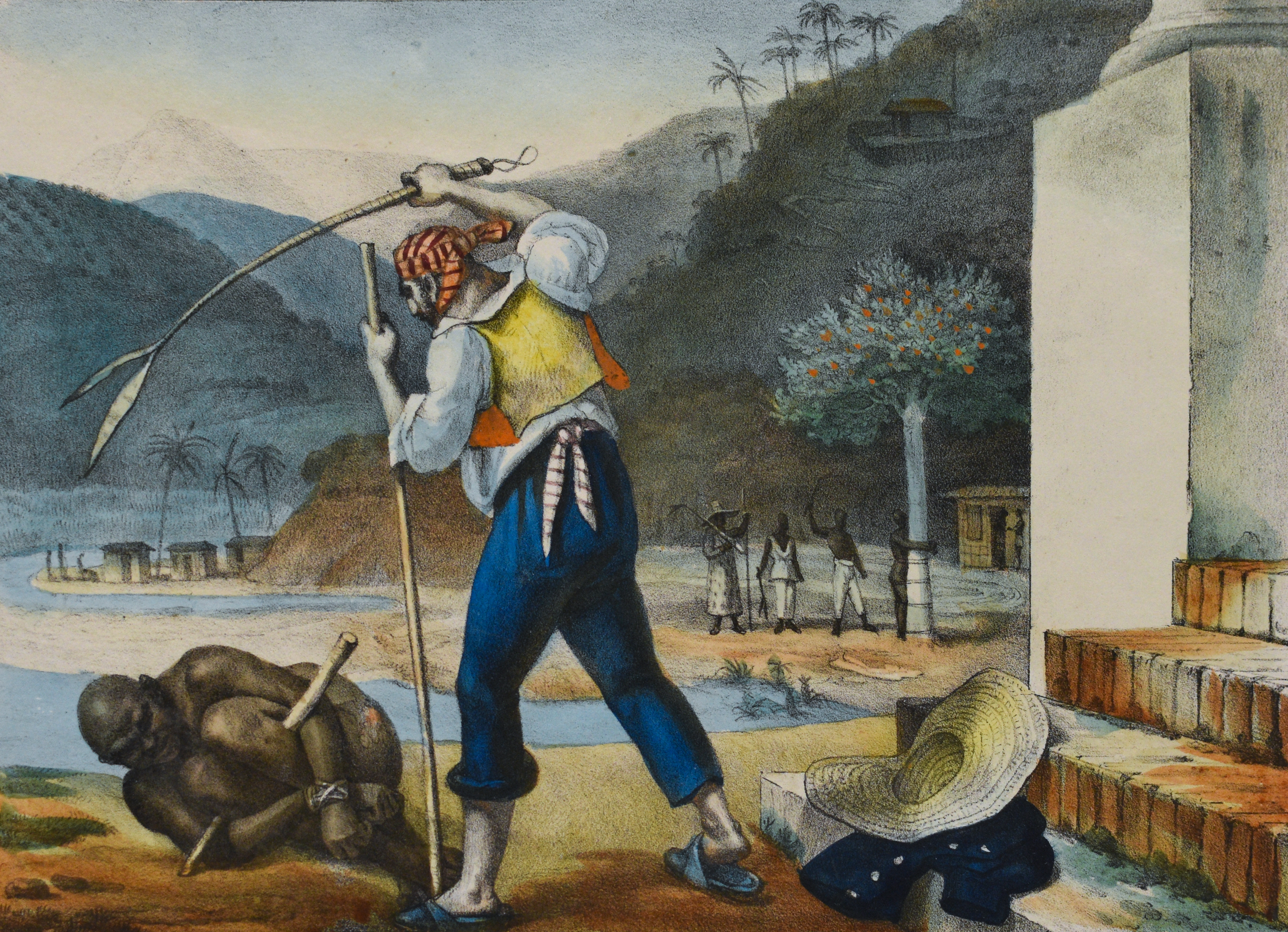
Slavery in Brazil by Jean-Baptiste Debret (1834–1839)

The transatlantic slave trade brought millions of Africans to the territories of the Americas under the colonial rule of European powers, especially South America. In South America, Portugal played a significant role in the trafficking of enslaved Africans, with estimates suggesting that about 40% of all Africans forcibly brought to the Americas were taken to Brazil alone, to work primarily in sugar cane plantations, mining, and agricultural endeavors. In North America, the British Empire was heavily involved in the transatlantic slave trade, with the establishment of colonies such as Virginia, where enslaved Africans were primarily used as labor in tobacco plantations and later in other agricultural and domestic sectors. This system perpetuated for centuries, shaping the socio-economic landscape of all nations of the hemisphere.

After the Haitian Revolution led by Jean-Jacques Dessalines, which started in 1791 and was the only successful slave revolt in history, the world's first black republic was established. It started with the massacre of the white population, between 3,000 and 5,000 white men and women of all ages were killed. Dessalines declared:

Oui, nous avons rendu à ces vrais cannibales guerre pour guerre, crimes pour crimes, outrages pour outrages.
Oui, j’ai sauvé mon pays, j’ai vengé l’Amérique.
Yes, we have rendered to these true cannibals war for war, crime for crime, outrage for outrage;
Yes, I have saved my country – I have avenged America.

— Dessalines, first president of the Republic of Haiti, 1804

=== Religion ===
The most prevalent faiths in the Americas are as follows:

- Christianity (86 percent)
  - Roman Catholicism: Practiced by 69 percent of the Latin American population (61 percent in Brazil whose Roman Catholic population of 134 million is the greatest of any nation's), approximately 24 percent of the United States' population and about 39 percent of Canada's.
  - Protestantism: Practiced mostly in the United States, where half of the population are Protestant, Canada, with slightly more than a quarter of the population, and Greenland; there is a growing contingent of Evangelical and Pentecostal movements in predominantly Catholic Latin America.
  - Eastern Orthodoxy: Found mostly in the United States (1 percent) and Canada; this Christian group is growing faster than many other Christian groups in Canada and now represents roughly 3 percent of the Canadian population.
  - Non-denominational Christians and other Christians (some 1,000 different Christian denominations and sects practiced in the Americas).
- Irreligion: About 12 percent, including atheists and agnostics, as well as those who profess some form of spirituality but do not identify themselves as members of any organized religion.
- Islam: Together, Muslims constitute about 1 percent of the North American population and 0.3 percent of all Latin Americans. It is practiced by 3 percent of Canadians and 0.6 percent of the U.S. population. Argentina has the largest Muslim population in Latin America with up to 600,000 persons, or 1.5 percent of the population.
- Judaism: Practiced by 2 percent of North Americans—approximately 2.5 percent of the U.S. population and 1.2 percent of Canadians—as well as 0.23 percent of Latin Americans. Argentina has the largest Jewish population in Latin America with 200,000 members.

Other faiths include Buddhism; Hinduism; Sikhism; Baháʼí Faith; a wide variety of indigenous religions, many of which can be categorized as animistic; new age religions and many African and African-derived religions. Syncretic faiths can also be found throughout the Americas.

Religious Demographics According to 2010 censuses/estimates in each country
Country	Christians	Catholics	Protestants	None/Atheists/Agnostics	Others
Argentina	86.2%	76.5%	9.7%	11.3%	2.5%
Bolivia	95.3%	73.7%	21.6%	3.7%	1.0%
Brazil	86.8%	64.6%	22.2%	8.4%	4.8%
Canada	62.6%	38.7%	23.9%	28.5%	8.9%
Chile	76.0%	60.0%	16.0%	21.0%	3.0%
Colombia	93.9%	80.3%	13.6%	5.2%	1.7%
Costa Rica	84.3%	70.5%	13.8%	11.3%	4.3%
Dominican Republic	87.1%	68.3%	18.8%	10.6%	2.2%
Ecuador	95.6%	87.8%	7.7%	3.5%	1.0%
El Salvador	75.5%	45.8%	29.7%	24.3%	1.2%
Guatemala	79.3%	47.6%	31.7%	18.3%	2.4%
Honduras	83.0%	47.9%	35.1%	14.3%	2.7%
Mexico	92.2%	82.7%	8.7%	4.9%	2.9%
Nicaragua	81.1%	54.3%	26.8%	16.8%	2.1%
Panama	90.0%	75.0%	15.0%	7.0%	3.0%
Paraguay	96.8%	90.4%	6.4%	1.4%	1.8%
Peru	96.7%	81.3%	12.5%	1.9%	1.4%
United States	79.9%	25.9%	54.0%	15.2%	5.0%
Uruguay	58.2%	47.1%	11.1%	40.4%	1.5%
Venezuela	89.0%	72.0%	17.0%	8.0%	3.0%

=== Languages ===
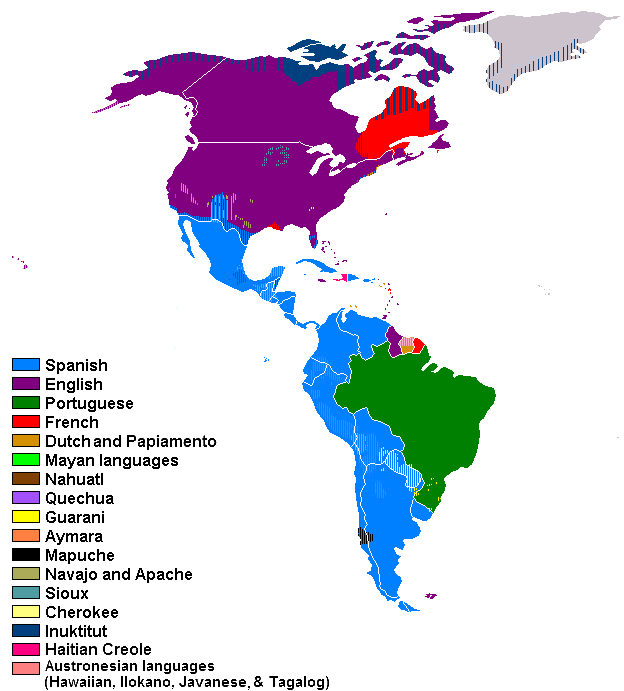
Languages spoken in the Americas

Various languages are spoken in the Americas. Some are of European origin, others are spoken by indigenous peoples or are the mixture of various languages like the different creoles.

The most widely spoken first language in the Americas is Spanish, followed by English and Portuguese. The dominant language of Latin America is Spanish, though the most populous nation in Latin America, Brazil, speaks Portuguese. Small enclaves of French-, Dutch- and English-speaking regions also exist in Latin America, notably in French Guiana, Suriname, and Belize and Guyana respectively. Haitian Creole is dominant in the nation of Haiti, where French is also spoken. Native languages are more prominent in Latin America than in Anglo-America, with Nahuatl, Quechua, Aymara, and Guaraní as the most common. Various other native languages are spoken with less frequency across both Anglo-America and Latin America. Creole languages other than Haitian Creole are also spoken in parts of Latin America.

The dominant language of Anglo-America is English. French is also official in Canada, where it is the predominant language in Quebec and an official language in New Brunswick along with English. It is also an important language in Louisiana, and in parts of New Hampshire, Maine, and Vermont. Spanish has kept an ongoing presence in the Southwestern United States, which formed part of the Viceroyalty of New Spain, especially in California and New Mexico, where a distinct variety of Spanish spoken since the 17th century has survived. It has more recently become widely spoken in other parts of the United States because of heavy immigration from Latin America. High levels of immigration in general have brought great linguistic diversity to Anglo-America, with over 300 languages known to be spoken in the United States alone, but most languages are spoken only in small enclaves and by relatively small immigrant groups.

The nations of Guyana, Suriname, and Belize are generally considered not to fall into either Anglo-America or Latin America because of their language differences from Latin America, geographic differences from Anglo-America, and cultural and historical differences from both regions; English is the primary language of Guyana and Belize, and Dutch is the primary language of Suriname.

Most of the non-native languages have, to different degrees, evolved differently from the mother country, but are usually still mutually intelligible. Some have combined, however, which has even resulted in completely new languages, such as Papiamento, which is a combination of Portuguese, Spanish, Dutch (representing the respective colonizers), native Arawak, various African languages, and, more recently English. The lingua franca Portuñol, a mixture of Portuguese and Spanish, is spoken in the border regions of Brazil and neighboring Spanish-speaking countries. More specifically, Riverense Portuñol is spoken by about 100,000 people in the border regions of Brazil and Uruguay. Because of immigration, there are many communities where other languages are spoken from all parts of the world, especially in the United States, Brazil, Argentina, Canada, Chile, Costa Rica, and Uruguay—very important destinations for immigrants.

== Culture ==
=== Sports ===
Baseball is one of the most popular sports in the Americas, having spread through the hemisphere after the growth of US influence in the late 19th century. It overtook cricket, a fellow bat-and-ball sport spread by earlier British influence, in most places outside of the Commonwealth Caribbean. Other American sports, such as basketball, have grown throughout the region over time.

Football is perhaps the most popular and followed sport in the Americas. The North American region which also includes the Central and Caribbean national associations is overseen by CONCACAF, while the South American region and its national teams are represented by CONMEBOL.

== Multinational organizations ==
The following is a list of multinational organizations in the Americas.

- Alliance for Progress
- American Capital of Culture
- Andean Community of Nations
- Association of Caribbean States
- Bank of the South
- Bolivarian Alternative for the Americas
- Caribbean Community
- CARICOM Single Market and Economy
- Central American Common Market
- Central American Parliament
- Community of Latin American and Caribbean States
- Contadora Group
- Free Trade Area of the Americas
- Latin American Free Trade Agreement
- Latin American Parliament or Parlatino
- Mercosur or Mercosul
- North Atlantic Treaty Organization
- Organization of American States
- Organisation of Eastern Caribbean States
- Organization of Ibero-American States
- Pacific Alliance
- Pan American Sports Organization
- Regional Security System
- Rio Group
- School of the Americas
- Summit of the Americas
- Union of South American Nations
- United States–Mexico–Canada Agreement
- YOA Orchestra of the Americas

== See also ==
- Amerrisque Mountains
- Abya Yala – indigenous name for the North and South American continents
- British North America
- Columbia (name)
- Ethnic groups in Central America
- French America
- Indigenous Peoples' Day
- La Merika
- Latin America and the Caribbean
- List of conflicts in the Americas
- List of former sovereign states
- List of oldest buildings in the Americas
- Monarchies in the Americas
- New Sweden
- Pan-Americanism
- Pan-American Highway
- Pan American Games
- Personification of the Americas
- Southern Cone
