= Pindorama =

Pindorama may refer to:

- Pindorama (film), a 1970 Brazilian drama film
- Pindorama Biological Reserve, a biological reserve in Brazil
- Pindorama do Tocantins, a municipality in the state of Tocantins, Brazil
- Pindorama, São Paulo, a municipality in the state of São Paulo, Brazil
