= Pindorama Biological Reserve =

Biological reserve in São Paulo, Brazil

- Reserva Biológica de Pindorama
- IUCN category Ia (strict nature reserve)
- Location within Brazil
- Nearest city: Catanduva, São Paulo
- Coordinates: 21°13′26″S 48°54′47″W
- Designation: Biological reserve
- Administrator: Agronegócio da Região Centro Norte

Pindorama Biological Reserve (Portuguese: Reserva Biológica de Pindorama) is a biological reserve in the state of São Paulo, Brazil.

== Location ==
The reserve is located in the municipality of Pindorama in the state of São Paulo. It has a total area of 532.8 hectares (1,317 acres). Altitude ranges from 498 to 594 metres (1,634 to 1,949 ft). Average annual rainfall is 1,258 millimetres (49.5 in). Average temperature is 19.3 °C (66.7 °F) in the winter and 23.8 °C (74.8 °F) in the summer.

== Conservation ==
The Pindorama Experimental Station of the Instituto Agronômico da Coordenadoria da Pesquisa Agropecuária was transformed into the biological reserve by law no.4.960 of 6 January 1986. There are four fragments of surviving tropical semi-deciduous forest of the Atlantic Forest biome, covering about 120 hectares (300 acres). 169 species of birds have been identified.

== Sources ==
- Barros, Daiane R. de; Santana, Jefferson Otaviano, "Avifauna da Reserva Biológica de Pindorama", Táxeus Listas de Espécies
- Franco Montoro (6 January 1986), Lei nº 4.960, de 6 de janeiro de 1986 (in Portuguese), Governo do Estado de São Paulo
- Nogueira Abdo, Maria Teresa Vilela; Valeri, Sergio Valiengo; Ferraudo, Antonio Sergio (2015), "Avaliação do efeito de borda da Reserva Biológica de Pindorama, SP", Revista Verde de Agroecologia e Desenvolvimento Sustentável (in Portuguese), 10 (4): 01, doi:10.18378/rvads.v10i4.3398
