= Pindorama, São Paulo =

Pindorama
- Municipality
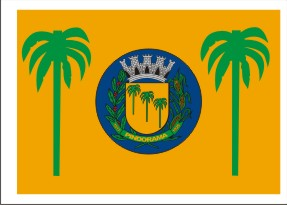
- Flag

- Location in São Paulo state

- Location in Brazil
- Coordinates: 21°11′09″S 48°54′26″W
- Country: Brazil
- Region: Southeast
- State: São Paulo
- Mesoregion: São José do Rio Preto

Area
  - Total: 184.8 km^{2} (71.4 sq mi)
- Elevation: 527 m (1,729 ft)

Population (2020)
  - Total: 17,216
  - Density: 93.16/km^{2} (241.3/sq mi)
- Time zone: UTC−3 (BRT)
- Postal code: 15830-000
- Area code: +55 17
- Website: www.pindorama.sp.gov.br

Pindorama (Portuguese pronunciation: [pĩdoˈɾɐ̃mɐ]) is a municipality in the state of São Paulo, Brazil. The name is Tupi (later Paulista General Language) for Land of the Palms, the natives name for Brazil. According to tradition, before colonisation "Pindorama" (Tupi for "Land of the Palms") was the native name of Brazil, given by the local indigenous peoples.

== Geography ==
The population is 17,216 (2020 est.) in an area of 184.8 km^{2} (71.4 sq mi). The municipality contains the 533 hectares (1,320 acres) Pindorama Biological Reserve, a strictly protected conservation unit created in 1986 from a former experimental agricultural station. Pindorama belongs to the Mesoregion of São José do Rio Preto.

== Economy ==
The Tertiary sector corresponds to 57.86% of Pindorama's GDP. The Primary sector is 9.45% of the GDP and the Industry corresponds to 32.70%.

== Media ==
In telecommunications, the city was served by Telecomunicações de São Paulo. In July 1998, this company was acquired by Telefónica, which adopted the Vivo brand in 2012. The company is currently an operator of cell phones, fixed lines, internet (fiber optics/4G) and television (satellite and cable).

== See also ==
- List of municipalities in São Paulo
- Interior of São Paulo
