= Languages of the Falkland Islands =

Languages of Falkland Islands
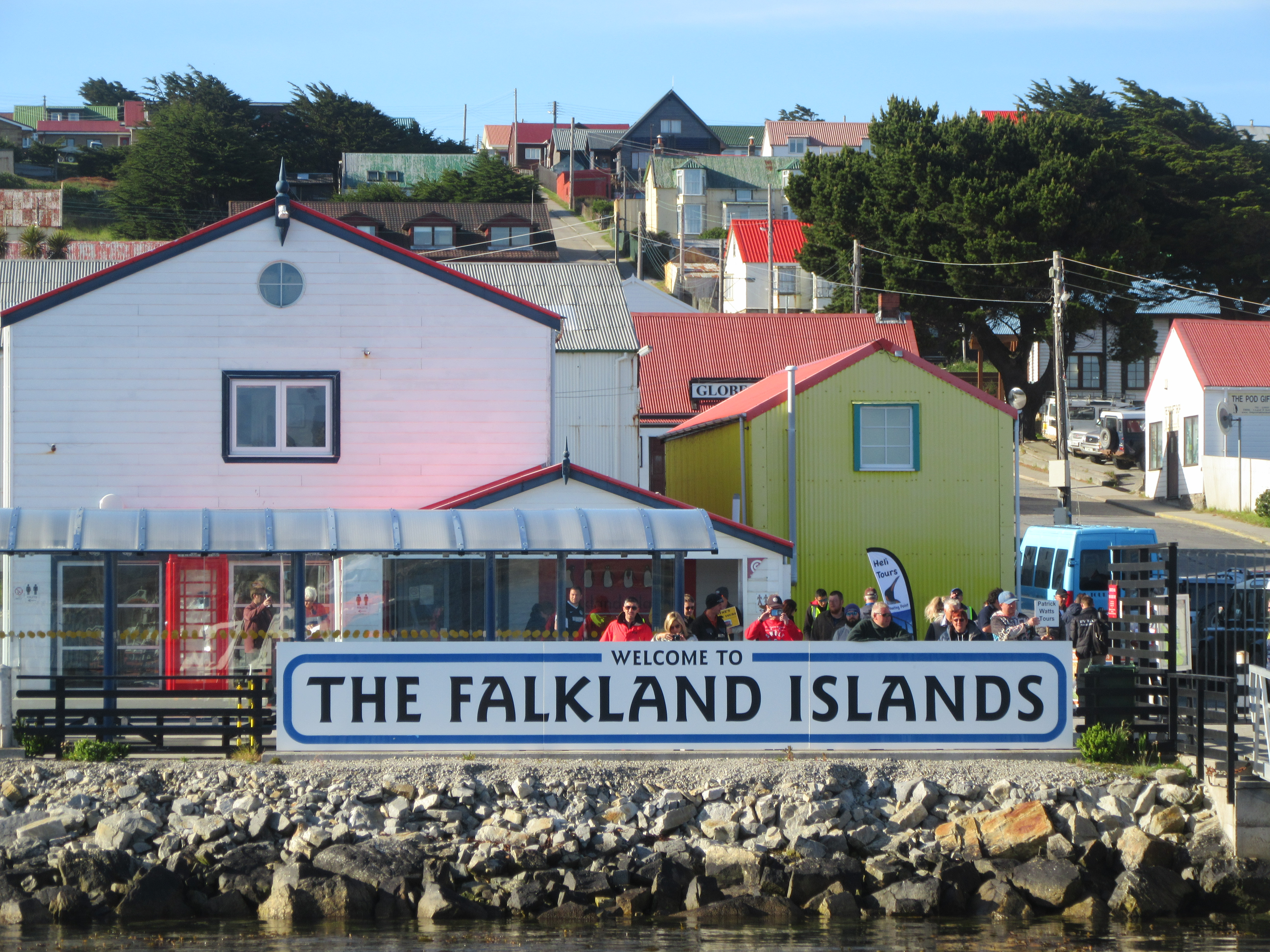
- Falkland Islands Welcome Sign
- Official: English
- Minority: Spanish, Portuguese
- Signed: British Sign Language
- Keyboard layout: British QWERTY

The only official language of the Falkland Islands is English, and this is spoken by everyone on a day-to-day basis. Spanish is spoken by 10% of the population, a significant minority. Most of the Spanish speakers are immigrants, foreign workers, and expats, predominantly from Chile. Knowledge of Spanish as a foreign language is fairly widespread, as it is a compulsory subject in school, being the lingua franca in much of mainland South America. As the schools follow the English education system, European Spanish, as prescribed by the Real Academia in Madrid, is taught, rather than a South American variety of the language, but Falkland Islanders may use seseo pronunciation typical of South American dialect.

== Falkland English dialect ==
Falkland Islands English is mainly British in character. However, as a result of the isolation of the islands, the small population has developed and retains its own accent/dialect, which persists despite a large number of immigrants from the United Kingdom in recent years. In rural areas (i.e. anywhere outside Port Stanley), known as ‘Camp’ (from Spanish campo or ‘countryside’), the Falkland accent tends to be stronger. The dialect has resemblances to Australian, New Zealand, West Country and Norfolk dialects of English, as well as Lowland Scots and High Tider.

== Historic ==
Several languages have been used historically in the Falkland Islands.

- French – the French were the first to colonise the islands, and their settlement at Port Louis would have used French. The islands' French name, Iles Malouines, stems from Saint-Malo.
- Yaghan – a missionary settlement on Keppel Island contained many Yaghans from Tierra del Fuego. The Falkland Islands fox was previously hypothesized to represent a possible pre-European landing on the Falklands, but this has since been refuted. This language has left no trace on the Falklands, and would not have been written at this time.
- Scottish Gaelic – many early settlers were from the Gaelic-speaking parts of Scotland, including the Western Isles and the western Highlands. William Blain, a settler from Dumfries, noted in 1878 that "the Scotch language was fairly well represented" and a majority of the population were "Scotch or of Scotch descendants".
