= List of country-name etymologies =

This list covers English-language country names with their etymologies. Some of these include notes on indigenous names and their etymologies. Countries in italics are endonyms or no longer exist as sovereign political entities.

== A ==
=== Afghanistan ===
From Classical Persian افغان (afğān, "Afghan"), from Bactrian αβαγανο (abagano), first attested in the fourth century AD, most likely a compound of *apāka- ("distant, faraway"), from Proto-Iranian *Hapá, from Proto-Indo-Iranian *Hapá ("away"), from Proto-Indo-European *h₂epó + *-āna ("ethnic group"), from Proto-Indo-European *-nós, thus: "people from a distant land". Various scholars have proposed Sanskrit etymologies since the nineteenth century (especially prior to the 2007 publication of earlier Bactrian attestations for the word), but linguist Johnny Cheung notes that these are "extremely difficult to reconcile" with recent evidence pointing to a Bactrian source.

=== Albania ===
"Land of the Albanians", Latinized from Byzantine Greek Albanía (Αλβανία), land of the rebel Albanoi (Αλβανοι) mentioned in Michael Attaliates The History around AD 1080. In her Alexiad, Anna Comnena also mentions a settlement called Albanon or Arbanon. Both may be survivals of the earlier Illyrian tribe, the Albani of the Albanopolis northeast of modern Durrës which appears in Ptolemy around AD 150. The demonym has been supposed to ultimately originate from Latin alba ("white") or from the proposed Proto-Indo-European *alb ("hill") or *alb- ("white").

Arbëri, its medieval endonym: "Land of the Albanians" in Albanian, presumably from the same source as above by way of rhotacism. An Arbanitai were mentioned in Attaliates's History as subjects of the Duke of Dyrrachium, near modern Durrës.
Arnavutluk, its Ottoman Turkish name: "Land of the Albanians", a metathesis from Byzantine Greek Arbanitai and the Turkish locative suffix -lik or -luk.
Shqipëri, its modern endonym: "Land of the Understanding", from the Albanian adverb shqip, "understanding each other". A popular pseudoetymology ("Land of the Eagles") erroneously derives it instead from shqiponjë ("eagle").

=== Algeria ===
"Land of Algiers", a Latinization of French colonial name l'Algérie adopted in 1839. The city's name derives from French Alger, itself from Catalan Aldjère, from the Ottoman Turkish Cezayir and Arabic al-Jazāʼir (الجزائر, "the Islands"). This was a truncated form of the city's older name, Jazā'ir Banī Māzġānna (جزائر بني مازغان, "Islands of the sons of Mazġannā"), which referred to four islands off the city's coast which were held by a local Sanhaja tribe.

Algiers or Algier, former names: As above.

=== Andorra ===
Etymology unknown. Andorra was established as part of Charlemagne's Marca Hispanica and its name may derive from Arabic ad-Darra (الدرا, "the Forest") or Navarro-Aragonese andurrial ("scrubland"). One folk etymology holds that it derives from the Biblical Endor, a name bestowed by Louis le Debonnaire after defeating the Moors in the "wild valleys of Hell".

=== Angola ===
"Land of Ndongo", from the Portuguese colonial name (Reino de Angola), which erroneously derived a toponym from the Mbundu title ngola a kiluanje ("conquering ngola", a priestly title originally denoting a "chief smith", then eventually "king") held by Ndambi a Ngola (Portuguese: Dambi Angola) as lord of Ndongo, a state in the highlands between the Kwanza and Lukala Rivers.

=== Antigua and Barbuda ===
Antigua: "Ancient", corrected from earlier Antego, a truncation of the Spanish Santa Maria la Antigua, bestowed in 1493 by Christopher Columbus in honor of the Virgen de la Antigua ("Virgin of the Old Cathedral"), a revered mid-14th-century icon in the Chapel of La Antigua in Seville Cathedral.
Barbuda: "Bearded" in Spanish, corrected from earlier Barbado, Berbuda, Barbouthos, &c. This may derive from the appearance of the island's fig trees, or from the beards of the indigenous people.

=== Argentina ===
The first description of the region by the word Argentina has been found on a Venetian map in 1536. The name "Argentina" comes from Italian. Argentina (masculine argentino) means in Italian "(made) of silver, silver coloured", derived from the Latin "argentum" for silver. La Argentina ("the silvery"), a 17th-century truncation of Tierra Argentina ("Land beside the Silvery River", lit. "Silvery Land"), named via argento (either in Italian or poetic Spanish) in reference to the Río de la Plata, so called by Italian explorer Sebastian Cabot during his expedition there in the 1520s after acquiring some silver trinkets from the Guaraní along the Paraná near modern-day Asunción, Paraguay.

=== Armenia ===
Etymology unknown. Latinized from Greek Armenía (Ἀρμενία), "Land of the Armenioi" (Αρμένιοι) attested in the 5th century BC, from Old Persian Armina attested in the late 6th century BC, of uncertain origin.
It may be a continuation of the Assyrian Armânum which was conquered by Naram-Sin in 2200 BC and has been identified with an Akkadian colony in the Diarbekr region. The name has also been claimed as a variant of the Urmani or Urmenu appearing in an inscription of Menuas of Urartu, as a proposed tribe of the Hayasa-Azzi known as the Armens (Armenian: Արմեններ, Armenner) or as a continuation of the Biblical Minni (Hebrew: מנּי) and Assyrian Minnai, corresponding to the Mannai. (Addition of the Sumerogram ^{ḪAR} would make this name equivalent to "the mountainous region of the Minni".) Diakonoff derived the name from a proposed Urartian and Aramaic amalgam *Armnaia ("inhabitant of Arme" or "Urme"), a region held by Proto-Armenians in the Sason mountains. Ultimately, the name has been connected to the Proto-Indo-European root *ar- ("assemble", "create") also found in the word Ararat, Aryan, Arta, &c.
The Armenians traditionally traced the name to an eponymous ancestor Aram (Armenian: Արամ), sometimes equated with Arame, the earliest known king of Urartu. Strabo derived the etymology from an Armenius of Armenium, a city on Lake Boebeïs in Thessaly, while Herodotus called them Phrygian colonists.

Hayastan, the local endonym: Etymology unknown. The modern Armenian Hayastan (Հայաստան) derives from earlier Armenian Hayk (Հայք) and Persian -stān (ستان). Hayk' derives from Old Armenian Haykʿ (հայք), traditionally derived from a legendary patriarch named Hayk (Հայկ). Aram above was considered to be one of his descendants.

=== Australia ===
"Southern Land" in Neo-Latin, adapted from the legendary pseudo-geographical Terra Australis Incognita ("Unknown Southern Land") dating back to the Roman era. First appearing as a corruption of the Spanish name for an island in Vanuatu in 1625, "Australia" was slowly popularized following the advocacy of the British explorer Matthew Flinders in his 1814 description of his circumnavigation of the island. Lachlan Macquarie, a Governor of New South Wales, used the word in his dispatches to England and recommended it be formally adopted by the Colonial Office in 1817. The Admiralty agreed seven years later and the continent became officially known as Australia in 1824. In Flinders' book he published his rationale:

"There is no probability, that any other detached body of land, of nearly equal extent, will ever be found in a more southern latitude; the name Terra Australis will, therefore, remain descriptive of the geographical importance of this country, and of its situation on the globe: it has antiquity to recommend it; and, having no reference to either of the two claiming nations, appears to be less objectionable than any other which could have been selected."
(Antarctica, the hypothesized land for which the name Terra Australis originally referred to, was sighted in 1820, and not explored until decades after Flinders' book had popularized this shift of the name.)
Oz, a colloquial endonym: Likely a contraction from above. Folk etymology traces the name to the 1939 film, The Wizard of Oz, but the Oxford English Dictionary records the first occurrence as "Oss" in 1908. Frank Baum's original book predates this and may have inspired the name, but it is also possible Baum himself was influenced by Australia in his development of Oz.
Nova Hollandia, a former name: "New Holland" in Neo-Latin (Dutch: Nieuw Holland), after the Dutch province, bestowed by the Dutch explorer Abel Tasman in 1644. For the further etymology of Holland, see the Netherlands below.

=== Austria ===
"Eastern March", Latinized as early as 1147 from German Österreich, from Old High German Ostarrîchi (996) or Osterrîche (998), from Medieval Latin Marchia Orientalis, an eastern prefecture for the Duchy of Bavaria established in 976.

=== Azerbaijan ===
"Land of Atropates", an Achaemenid then Hellenistic-era king over a region in present-day Iranian Azarbaijan and Iranian Kurdistan, south of the modern state. "Azerbaijan" derives from Persian Āzarbāydjān, from earlier Ādharbāyagān and Ādharbādhagān, from Middle Persian Āturpātākān, from Old Persian Atropatkan. (The name is often derived from the Greek Atropatene (Ἀτροπατηνή), Atropátios Mēdía (Ἀτροπάτιος Μηδία), or Tropatēnē (Τροπατηνή), although these were exonyms and Atropatkan was never thoroughly Hellenized.) Atropatkan was a renaming of the Achaemenian XVIII Satrapy of Eastern Armenia, comprising Matiene and the surrounding Urartians and Saspirians, upon Aturpat's declaration of independence from the Diadochi Seleucus following the death of Alexander the Great. Aturpat's own name (Old Persian:; Ancient Greek: Aτρoπάτης, Atropátēs) is the Old Persian for "protected by atar", the holy fire of Zoroastrianism.

Albania, a former name: From the Latin Albānia, from the Greek Albanía (Ἀλβανία), related to the Old Armenian Ałuankʿ (Աղուանք). The native Lezgic name(s) for the country is unknown, but Strabo reported its people to have 26 different languages and to have only been recently unified in his time. It is often referenced as "Caucasian Albania" in modern scholarship to distinguish it from the European country above.
Arran, a former name: From the Middle Persian Arran, from Parthian Ardhan, derived via rhotacism from earlier names as above.

== B ==
=== Bahamas ===
"Large upper middle island", from the Lucayan name Bahama used by the indigenous Taíno people for the island of Grand Bahama. Tourist guides often state that the name comes from the Spanish baja mar ('shallow sea'), in reference to the reef-filled Bahama Banks.

=== Bahrain ===
"The Two Seas" in Arabic (البحرين, al-Baḥrayn). However, the question of which two seas were originally intended remains in dispute. A popular folk etymology relates Bahrain to the "two seas" mentioned five times in the Quran. The passages, however, do not refer to the modern island but rather to the Saudi deserts opposite modern Bahrain. It is possible Bahrain (previously known as Awal) simply acquired its name when that region became known as al-Hasa, but today the name is generally taken to refer to the island itself. The two seas are then the bay east and west of the island, the seas north and south of the island, or the salt water surrounding the island and the fresh water beneath it which appears in wells and also bubbling up at places in the middle of the gulf. An alternate theory offered by al-Ahsa was that the two seas were the Great Green Ocean and a peaceful lake on the mainland; still another provided by al-Jawahari is that the original formal name Bahri (lit. "belonging to the sea") would have been misunderstood and so was opted against.

=== Bangladesh ===
The etymology of Bangladesh (Country of Bengal) can be traced to the early 20th century, when Bengali patriotic songs, such as Namo Namo Namo Bangladesh Momo by Kazi Nazrul Islam and Aaji Bangladesher Hridoy by Rabindranath Tagore, used the term. The term Bangladesh was often written as two words, Bangla Desh, in the past. Starting in the 1950s, Bengali nationalists used the term in political rallies in East Pakistan.

The exact origin of the word Bangla is unknown, though it is believed to come from "Vanga", an ancient kingdom mentioned in world's largest Epic Mahabharat even Ramayan and geopolitical division on the Ganges delta in the Indian subcontinent. It was located in southern Bengal, with the core region including present-day southern West Bengal (India) and southwestern Bangladesh. The suffix "al" came to be added to it from the fact that the ancient rajas of this land raised mounds of earth 10 feet high and 20 in breadth in lowlands at the foot of the hills which were called "al". From this suffix added to the Bung, the name Bengal arose and gained currency". Support to this view is found in Ghulam Husain Salim's Riyaz-us-Salatin.

Other theories point to a Bronze Age proto-Dravidian tribe, the Austric word "Bonga" (Sun god), and the Iron Age Vanga Kingdom. The Indo-Aryan suffix Desh is derived from the Sanskrit word deśha, which means "land" or "country". Hence, the name Bangladesh means "Land of Bengal" or "Country of Bengal".Sanskrit language influenced the name of Bangladesh. The term Vanga was used in the Sanskrit texts.

The term Bangla denotes both the Bengal region and the Bengali language. The earliest known usage of the term is the Nesari plate in 805 AD. The term Vangaladesa is found in 11th-century South Indian records. The term gained official status during the Sultanate of Bengal in the 14th century. Shamsuddin Ilyas Shah proclaimed himself as the first "Shah of Bangala" in 1342. The word Bangla became the most common name for the region during the Islamic period. The Portuguese referred to the region as Bengala in the 16th century.

=== Barbados ===
"Bearded ones", from the Portuguese As Barbadas, corrected from earlier Barbata, Barbuda, S. Barduda, Barbadoes, &c. First attested by a 1519 map done by the Genoese cartographer Visconte Maggiolo. As with Barbuda, the name may derive from the appearance of the island's fig trees or from the beards of the indigenous people. (Isaac Taylor was of the opinion that Barbuda was named for its men, Barbados for its figs.)

=== Belarus ===
"White Russia", a compound of the Belarusian bel- (бел-, "white") and Rus (Русь, Rus') adopted in 1991. The meaning is "Russian" in the cultural and historic (Old East Slavic: рускъ, ruskʺ; Old Belarusian: руски, ruski; Russian: русский, russkiy) but not national sense (Russian: россиянин, rossiyánin), a distinction sometimes made by translating the name as "White Ruthenia", although "Ruthenian" has other meanings as well. The name is first attested in the 13th century as German Weissrussland and Latin Russia Alba, first in reference to Russia's White and then Black Sea coasts. The exonym was next applied to Great Novgorod and then Muscovy after its conquest of that region, finally being applied to its present region in the late 16th century to describe ethnically Russian regions being conquered from Poland. This last change was politically motivated, with Russia employing the foreign term to justify its revanchism at Poland's expense. The original meaning of "white" in Belarus's name is unknown. It may simply have arisen from confusion with legends concerning Caucasian Albania or from a use of colors to distinguish cardinal directions as seen in "Red Russia". Other theories include its use to distinguish Belarus as "free" or "pure", particularly of Mongolian control, or to distinguish the region from "Black Russia", a region of productive soil. For the further etymology of Rus, see Russia below.

Belorussia or Byelorussia, a former name: "White Russia" in Russian (Белоруссия, Belorussiya), truncated from the White Russian Soviet Socialist Republic (Белору́сская Сове́тская Социалисти́ческая Респу́блика, Belorússkaya Sovétskaya Sotsalistícheskaya Respúblika) declared in 1919.
White Russia, a former name: a translation of the above.

=== Belgium ===
"Land of the Belgae", from the Roman province of Gallia Belgica ("Belgic Gaul") derived from the Latinized name of a Celtic tribe. The present Kingdom of Belgium adopted the name upon its independence from the Netherlands in 1830 based on the French-language name of Henri Van der Noot's brief-lived United States of Belgium (États-Belgiques-Unis) which had declared its independence from Austria in 1790. The tribe's exact endonym remains unknown, but the name Belgae is usually traced to the proposed Proto-Celtic root *belg- from the Proto-Indo-European *bhelgh-, both meaning "to bulge" or "to swell" (particularly with anger) and cognate with the Old English belgan, "to be angry". An alternate etymology takes it from a proposed Proto-Indo-European root meaning "dazzling" or "bright"

=== Belize ===
Etymology unknown. Traditionally derived from a Spanish transcription of "Wallace", a Scottish buccaneer who established an eponymous settlement (on Spanish maps, Valize and Balize) along the Belize River (which he also named after himself) in the early 17th century. Alternatively taken from the Mayan word beliz ("muddy water"), presumably in reference to the river, or from Kongolese Africans who brought the name with them from Cabinda. Adopted in 1973 while still a self-governing colony of the United Kingdom.
A previous folk etymology took it from the French balise ("beacon").

British Honduras, a former name: See Honduras and Great Britain below.

=== Benin ===
"[Land beside] the Bight of Benin", the stretch of the Gulf of Guinea west of the Niger delta, a purposefully neutral name chosen to replace Dahomey (see below) in 1975. The Bight itself is named after a city and a kingdom in present-day Nigeria having no relation to the modern Benin. The English name comes from a Portuguese transcription (Benin) of a local corruption (Bini) of the Itsekiri form (Ubinu) of the Yoruba Ile-Ibinu ("Home of Vexation"), a name bestowed on the Edo capital by the irate Ife oba Oranyan in the 12th century.
An alternate theory derives Bini from the Arabic bani (بني, "sons" or "tribe").

Dahomey or Dahomy, a former name: "Belly of Dã" in Fon (Dã Homè), from the palace of the ahosu Akaba, traditionally built over the entrails of a local ruler. In Fon, the name "Dã" or "Dan" can also mean "snake" or the snake-god Damballa. Upon the restoration of independence, the name was deemed no longer appropriate since the historic kingdom comprised only the southern regions and ethnicities of the modern state.
Abomey, a former name: "Ramparts" in Fon (Agbomè), from the palace of the ahosu Houegbadja.

=== Bhutan ===
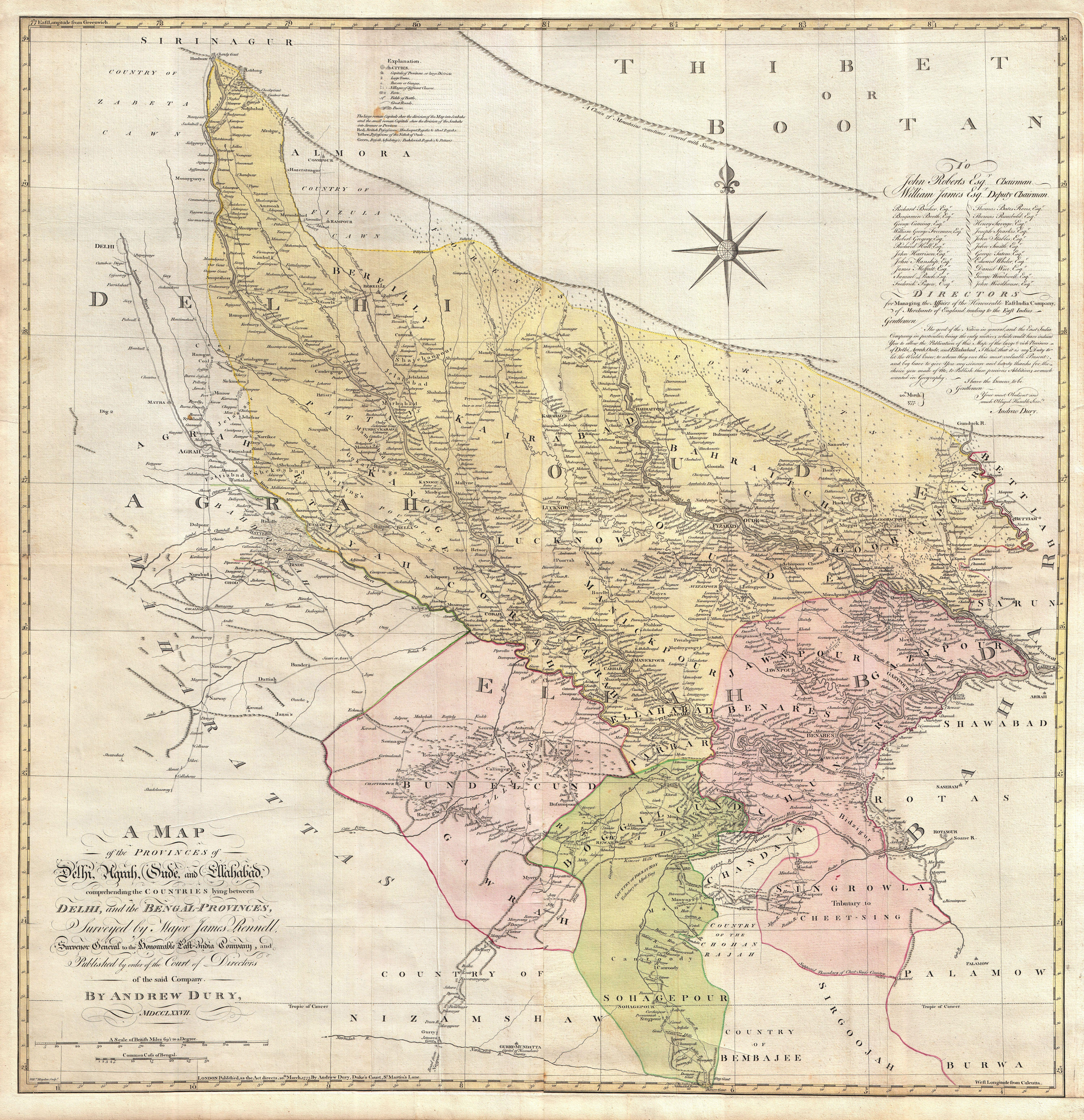
1777

1786

Two of Rennell's EIC maps, showing the division of "Thibet or Bootan" into separate regions.

Etymology unknown. Names similar to Bhutan—including Bottanthis, Bottan, Bottanter—began to appear in Europe around the 1580s. Jean-Baptiste Tavernier's 1676 Six Voyages is the first to record the name Boutan. However, in every case, these seem to have been describing not modern Bhutan but the Kingdom of Tibet. The modern distinction between the two did not begin until well into George Bogle's 1774 expedition—realizing the differences between the two regions, cultures, and states, his final report to the East India Company formally proposed labeling the Druk Desi's kingdom as "Boutan" and the Panchen Lama's as "Tibet". Subsequently, the EIC's surveyor general James Rennell first anglicized the French name as Bootan and then popularized the distinction between it and greater Tibet. The name is traditionally taken to be a transcription of the Sanskrit Bhoṭa-anta (भोट-अन्त, "end of Tibet"), in reference to Bhutan's position as the southern extremity of the Tibetan plateau and culture. "Bhutan" may have been truncated from this or been taken from the Nepali name Bhutān (भूटान). It may also come from a truncation of Bodo Hathan ("Tibetan place"). All of these ultimately derive from the Tibetan endonym Bod. An alternate theory derives it from the Sanskrit Bhu-Utthan (भू-उत्थान, "highlands").

Druk Yul, the local endonym: "Land of the Thunder Dragon" in Bhutanese (འབྲུག་ཡུལ་). Variations of this were known and used as early as 1730. The first time a Kingdom of Bhutan separate from Tibet did appear on a western map, it did so under its local name as "Broukpa".

=== Bolivia ===
"Land of Bolívar" in Neo-Latin, in honor of Simón Bolívar, one of the leading generals in the Spanish American wars of independence. Bolívar had given his lieutenant Antonio José de Sucre the option to keep Upper Peru under Peru, to unite it with the United Provinces of the Río de la Plata, or to declare its independence. A national assembly opted for independence, then sought to placate Bolívar's doubts by naming Bolívar as the first president of a country named in his honor. The original name "Republic of Bolívar" was swiftly changed to Bolivia at the urging of the congressman Manuel Martín Cruz.
Bolívar's own name derives from the village of Bolibar in Spanish Biscay. Its name comes from the Basque bolu ("windmill") and ibar ("valley").

=== Bosnia and Herzegovina ===
Bosnia: "Land of the river Bosna" in Latin, first attested in the Byzantine emperor Constantine VII's 958 De Administrando Imperio. (The 12th-century Chronicle of the Priest of Duklja also mentions an 8th-century source for the name which, however, has not survived.) "Bosna" was the medieval name of the classical Latin Bossina. Anton Mayer proposed a connection with the proposed Proto-Indo-European roots *bos or *bogh ("running water"). Certain Roman sources similarly mention Bathinus flumen as a name of the Illyrian Bosona, both of which would mean "running water" as well. Other theories involve the rare Latin Bosina ("boundary") or possible Slavic origins.
Herzegovina: "Duchy" or "Dukedom", an amalgam of German Herzog ("duke") and the Bosnian -ovina ("-land"). The duke was Stjepan Vukčić, Grand Voivode of Bosnia, who proclaimed himself "Duke of Hum and the Coast" and then either proclaimed himself or was bestowed the title "Duke of Saint Sava of Serbia" by the Holy Roman Emperor Frederick III around 1448. The Ottoman sanjak formed in the area after its 1482 conquest was simply called Hersek, but the longer Bosnian form was adopted by Austria and English.

=== Botswana ===
"Country of the Tswana" in Setswana, after the country's dominant ethnic group. The etymology of "Tswana" is uncertain. Livingstone derived it from the Setswana tshwana ("alike", "equal"), others from a word for "free". However, other early sources suggest that while the Tswana adopted the name, it was an exonym they learned from the Germans and British.
- Bechuanaland, a former name: from "Bechuana", an alternate spelling of "Botswana".

=== Brazil ===
Brazilwood, from the Portuguese Terra do Brasil, from the tree pau-brasil ("brazilwood", lit. "wood of ember", "wood in ember"), a name derived from its similarity to red-hot embers (Portuguese: brasa). The name may have been a translation of the Tupi ibirapitanga, also meaning "red-wood". The ending -il derives from the diminutive Latin suffix -ilus.
The appearance of islands named "Bracile", "Hy-Brazil", or "Ilha da Brasil" on maps as early as the c. 1330 portolan chart of Angelino Dulcert sometimes leads etymologists to question the standard etymology. While most of these islands of Brazil are found off the coast of Ireland and may be taken to stem from a Celtic rendering of the legendary Isle of the Blessed, the 1351 Medici Atlas places one Brazil near Ireland and a second one off the Azores near Terceira Island. That use may derive from its four volcanoes or reference its dragon's blood, a red resin dye. Regardless, the initial names of present-day Brazil were Ilha de Vera Cruz ("Island of the True Cross") and then – after it was discovered to be a new mainland – Terra de Santa Cruz ("Land of the Holy Cross"); this only changed after a Lisbon-based merchant consortium led by Fernão de Loronha leased the new colony for massive exploitation of the costly dyewood which had previously been available only from India.

Pindorama, a former name: "Land of the Palm Trees" in Guarani, the language of the Guarani people of Paraguay and southwest Brazil.

=== Britain ===
From the Latin name Britannia meaning Land of the Britons..

=== Brunei ===
- Full name of Brunei is Brunei Darussalam, Darussalam is in Arabic which mean the Abode of Peace.
  Etymology unknown. Modern folk etymology derives the name Brunei from a Malay exclamation Barunah! ("There!"), supposedly exclaimed by Awang Alak Betatar, the legendary 14th-century sultan, upon landing on Borneo or upon moving from Garang to the Brunei River delta. An earlier folk etymology traced it to his alleged membership in an Arabian tribe called the Buranun. Chinese sources recording a mission from the king of "Boni" (渤泥, Bóní) as early as 978 and a later "P'o-li" (婆利, Pólì) seem to contradict these but may refer to Borneo as a whole. It is mentioned in the 15th-century history of Java as a country conquered by Adaya Mingrat, general of Angka Wijaya, and around 1550 by the Italian Ludovico di Varthema under the name "island of Bornei". Other derivations include an Indian word for "seafarers" (from Sanskrit: वरुण, varunai), another for "land" (from Sanskrit: bhumi), or the Kelabit for the Limbang River. It is also said that the word 'Brunei' is said to have come from the Sanskrit word Bhūrṇi (भूर्णि) which means "land" or "earth" and Brunei could have been called Karpūradvīpa (कर्पूरद्वीप) which means "camphor island" as camphor was one export Brunei was well known for in ancient times.

=== Bulgaria ===
From the Bulgars, the extinct tribe of Turkic origin, which created the country. Their name is possibly derived from the Proto-Turkic word bulģha ("to mix", "shake", "stir") and its derivative bulgak ("revolt", "disorder") Alternate etymologies include derivation from a Mongolic cognate bulğarak ("to separate", "split off") or from a compound of proto-Turkic bel ("five") and gur ("arrow" in the sense of "tribe"), a proposed division within the Utigurs or Onogurs ("ten tribes").
Within Bulgaria, some historians question the identification of the Bulgars as a Turkic tribe, citing certain linguistic evidence (such as Asparukh's name) in favor of a North Iranian or Pamiri origin.

=== Burkina Faso ===
"Land of Honest Men", from an amalgam of More burkina ("honest", "upright", or "incorruptible men") and Dioula faso ("homeland"; literally "father's house"), selected by President Thomas Sankara following his 1983 coup to replace Upper Volta.

Upper Volta, a former name: "Land of the Upper Volta River", whose main tributaries originate in the country. The Volta itself (Portuguese: "twist", "turn") was named by Portuguese gold traders exploring the region.

=== Burma ===
Named for the Burmans, the nation's largest ethnic group, a correction of 18th-century "Bermah" and "Birma", from Portuguese Birmania, probably from Barma in various Indian languages, ultimately from Burmese Bama, a colloquial oral version of the literary Myanma, the eventual pronunciation of the Old Burmese Mranma, first attested in an 1102 Mon inscription as Mirma, of uncertain etymology. It was not until the mid-19th century that King Mindon referred to his position as "king of the Myanma people", as it was only during the Konbaung Dynasty that Burmans fully displaced the Mon within the Irrawaddy valley.
The Indian name is alternatively derived from Brahmadesh (Sanskrit: ब्रह्मादेश), "land of Brahma". A folk etymology of Myanma derives it from myan ("fast") and mar ("tough", "strong").

Myanmar, the present endonym: As above. The terminal r included in the official English translation arose from the nation's status as a former British colony and reflects non-rhotic accents such as Oxford English.

=== Burundi ===
"Land of the Ikirundi speakers" in Ikirundi, adopted upon independence from Belgian-occupied Rwanda-Urundi in 1962.

== C ==
=== Cambodia ===
"Land of the Kambojas". Latinized from French Cambodge via an intermediate Khmer form Kampuchea, from Sanskrit Kambujadeśa (कम्बोजदेश). The AD 947 Baksei Chamkrong inscription explains (and probably invented) the Sanskrit name from Kambu, a legendary Indian sage who journeyed to Indochina and married a naga princess named Mera, plus (-ja) meaning "descendants of". In informal usage Cambodians refer to their country as Srok Khmer, "Land of the Khmers".

=== Cameroon ===
"Shrimp", from the singular French Cameroun derived from the German Kamerun, from the anglicized "Cameroons" derived from the Portuguese Rio de Camarões ("Shrimp River") bestowed in 1472 on account of a massive swarm of the Wouri River's ghost shrimp.

Kamerun, a former name: The German name for their colony there between 1884 and the end of World War I, as above. Formerly also known simply as German Cameroon.
Cameroun, a former name: The French name for their colony there between World War I and 1960, as above. Formerly also known simply as French Cameroons.

=== Canada ===
A prominent theory is that the word Canada means "Village", from Iroquoian Kanada, adopted for the entire Canadian Confederation in 1867, from name of the British Province of Canada formed by the 1841 reunification of Upper and Lower Canada, previously established by a division of Quebec, the British renaming of the French territory of Canada. French Canada had received its name when its administrators adopted the name used by the explorer Jacques Cartier to refer to St. Lawrence River and the territory along it belonging to the Iroquoian chief Donnacona. In 1535, he had misunderstood the Laurentian Kanada as the name of Donnacona's capital Stadacona.
Another popular theory is that it folk etymology derived the name from Spanish or Portuguese acá or cá nada ("nothing here") in reference to the region's lack of gold or silver.

Quebec, a former name: "Where the river narrows", from Algonquin kébec via French, in reference to the St. Lawrence River near modern Quebec City. Samuel de Champlain chose the name in 1608 for the new town there, which gave its name to a section of French Canada and then the British province of Quebec, which eventually became modern Canada and even briefly included the entire Ohio River valley between the enactment of the Quebec Act in 1774 and the surrender of the region to the United States in 1783. (Modern Quebec was formed from Canada East during the Canadian Confederation in 1867.)

=== Cabo Verde ===
"Green Cape", from the Portuguese Cabo Verde, from its position across from the mainland cape of that name since its discovery in 1444. The cape is located beside Gorée Island in the modern nation of Senegal and is now known by its French form "Cap-Vert".

=== Central African Republic ===
Self-descriptive, from its French name République centrafricaine. For further etymology of "Africa", see List of continent-name etymologies.

Ubangi-Shari, a former name: From the French Oubangui-Chari, from the Ubangi and the Chari Rivers, which ran through the territory.

=== Chad ===
"Lake", from Lake Chad in the country's southwest, whose name derives from the Kanuri tsade ("lake").

=== Chile ===
Etymology unknown. The name dates to the "men of Chilli", the survivors of the first Spanish expedition into the region in 1535 under Diego de Almagro. Almagro applied the name to the Mapocho valley, but its further etymology is debated. The 17th-century Spanish chronicler Diego de Rosales derived it from the Quechua Chili, a toponym for the Aconcagua valley, which he considered a corruption of Tili, the name of a Picunche chief who ruled the area at the time of its conquest by the Inca. Modern theories derive it from the similarly named Incan settlement and valley of Chili in Peru's Casma Valley, the Quechua chiri ("cold"), the Aymara tchili ("snow" or "depths"), the Mapuche chilli ("where the land ends" or "runs out"), or the Mapuche cheele-cheele ("yellow-winged blackbird").
A folk etymology attributes the name to chili peppers, sometimes via the Mexican Spanish chile ("chili"), but the two are almost certainly unrelated.

=== China ===
Derived from Middle Persian Chīnī چینی, derived from Sanskrit Cīnāh (चीन). Often said that the word "China" and its related terms are derived from the Qin state which existed on the furthest west of China proper since the 9th century BC, and which later unified China to form the Qin dynasty (秦, Old Chinese: *dzin). This is still the most commonly held theory, although other suggestions have been mooted. The existence of the word Cīna in ancient Hindu texts was noted by the Sanskrit scholar Hermann Jacobi who pointed out its use in the work Arthashastra with reference to silk and woven cloth produced by the country of Cīna. The word is also found in other texts including the Mahābhārata and the Laws of Manu. The Indologist Patrick Olivelle however argued that the word Cīnā may not have been known in India before the first century BC, nevertheless he agreed that it probably referred to Qin but thought that the word itself was derived from a Central Asian language. Some Chinese and Indian scholars argued for the state of Jing (荆) as the likely origin of the name. Another suggestion, made by Geoff Wade, is that the Cīnāh in Sanskrit texts refers to an ancient kingdom centered in present-day Guizhou, called Yelang, in the south Tibeto-Burman highlands. The inhabitants referred to themselves as Zina according to Wade. The word in Europe is first recorded in 1516 in the journal of Portuguese explorer Duarte Barbosa. The word is first recorded in English in a translation published in 1555.

Cathay, a former & literary name: "Khitai", from Marco Polo's Italian Catai, used for northern but not southern China, ultimately from the Khitan endonym Kitai Gur ("Kingdom of the Khitai"), possibly via Persian Khitan (ختن) or Chinese Qìdān (契丹).
Seres and Serica, former names: "Land of Silk" in Greek (Σηρες, Sēres) and Latin, respectively. The further etymology is typically derived from the Chinese for silk (simplified Chinese: 丝; traditional Chinese: 絲; pinyin: sī), but the modern correspondence belies the Old Chinese pronunciation *sə.
Zhongguo or Chung-kuo (simplified Chinese: 中国; traditional Chinese: 中國; pinyin: Zhōngguó), the most common endonym: originally meaning "Central Demesne", then "Middle Kingdom", now equivalent to "Central Nation".
(For other endonyms, see Names of China.)

=== Colombia ===
"Land of Columbus" in Spanish, adopted in 1863 in honor of the earlier Gran Colombia formed by Simón Bolívar in 1819 after a proposal of Francisco de Miranda for a single pan–Hispanic American state.

Cundinamarca, a former name: "Condor's Nest" in Quechua phono-semantically matched with the Spanish marca ("march"), adopted upon independence from Spain in 1810 on the erroneous assumption it had been the indigenous Chibcha name for the native kingdom around Bogotá and the Magdalena Valley.
New Granada, a former name: Self-descriptive, from the earlier Spanish Viceroyalty of New Granada, named after the region of Province of Granada in Spain. Adopted in 1835 following the secession of Venezuela and Ecuador from Gran Colombia. For further etymology of "Granada", see Grenada below.
Granadine Confederation, a former name: From the adjectival form of Granada (Spanish: Granadina).

=== Comoros ===
"Moons", from the Arabic Jazā'ir al-Qamar (جزر القمر, "Islands of the Moon").

=== Republic of the Congo ===
"[Land beside] the Congo River", adopted by the country upon independence in 1960 from the previous French autonomous colony Republic of the Congo (French: République du Congo) established in 1958, ultimately from the name of the original French colony French Congo (Congo français) established in 1882. The river itself derived its name from Kongo, a Bantu kingdom which occupied its mouth around the time of its discovery by the Portuguese in 1483 or 1484 and whose name derived from its people, the Bakongo, an endonym said to mean "hunters" (Kongo: mukongo, nkongo).

French Congo, a former name: As above, with the inclusion of its occupier to distinguish it from the Belgian-controlled Congo to its south. For further etymology of "France", see below.
Middle Congo, a former name: From its position along the river, a translation of the French Moyen-Congo, adopted as the colony's name between 1906 and 1958.
Congo (Brazzaville): As above, with the inclusion of the country's capital to distinguish it from Congo (Léopoldville) or (Kinshasa) to its south. Brazzaville itself derives from the colony's founder, Pierre Savorgnan de Brazzà, an Italian nobleman whose title referred to the town of Brazzacco, in the comune of Moruzzo, whose name derived from the Latin Brattius or Braccius, both meaning "arm".

=== Democratic Republic of the Congo ===
As above, adopted upon independence in 1960 as Republic of the Congo (French: République du Congo).

Congo Free State, a former name: As above, a translation of the French État indépendant du Congo ("Free State of the Congo"), formed by Leopold II of Belgium in 1885 to administer the holdings of the International Congo Society acknowledged as separate from the country of Belgium at the 1884 Berlin Conference.
Belgian Congo, a former name: As above, following the Free State's union with Belgium in 1908, whose name was often included to distinguish the colony from the French-controlled Congo to its north. For further etymology of "Belgium", see above.
Congo (Léopoldville) and Congo-Léopoldville, former names: As above, with the inclusion of the country's capital to distinguish it from Congo (Brazzaville) to its north. This usage was especially common when both countries shared identical official names prior to Congo-Léopoldville's adoption of the name "Democratic Republic of the Congo" (République démocratique du Congo) in 1964. Léopoldville itself was named for Leopold II of Belgium upon its founding in 1881. Leopold's own name derives from Latin leo ("lion") or Old High German liut ("people") and OHG bald ("brave").
Congo (Kinshasa) and Congo-Kinshasa, alternate names: As above, following the renaming of Léopoldville after the nearby native settlement of Kinshasa or Kinchassa to its east as part of the Mobutist Authenticity movement.
Zaire or Zaïre, a former name: "[Land beside] the Congo River", a French form of a Portuguese corruption of the Kongo Nzere ("river"), a truncation of Nzadi o Nzere ("river swallowing rivers"), adopted for the river and the country between 1971 and 1997 as part of the Authenticity movement.

=== Costa Rica ===
"Rich Coast" in Spanish, although the origin of the epithet is disputed. Some claim it was bestowed by the Italian explorer Christopher Columbus in 1502 as Costa del Oro ("Gold Coast"), others by the Spanish conquistador Gil González Dávila.

=== Côte d'Ivoire ===
"Ivory Coast" in French, from its previous involvement in the ivory trade. Similar names for Côte d'Ivoire and other nearby countries include the "Grain Coast", the "Gold Coast", and the "Slave Coast".

Ivory Coast, an alternate name: Self-descriptive, the English translation of the above.

=== Croatia ===
Etymology uncertain. From Medieval Latin Croātia, from Cruati ("Croatians") attested in the Šopot Inscription, from North-West Slavic Xrovat-, by liquid metathesis from proposed Common Slavic *Xorvat-, from proposed Proto-Slavic *Xarwāt- (*Xъrvatъ) or *Xŭrvatŭ (*xъrvatъ).
The most common theory derives it from Harahvat-, the Old Persian name for the Arachosia or Helmand River, or from Harahuvatiš, the land surrounding it. This is cognate with the Vedic Sarasvatī and Avestan Harax^{v}aitī. This derivation seems to be supported by a 3rd-century Scythian form Xoroathos (ΧΟΡΟΑΘΟΣ) appearing in the Tanais Tablets.
Alternate theories include Zbigniew Gołąb's proposal that it is a borrowing from Proto-Germanic *C(h)rovati, presumed to mean "warriors clad with horn-armor" or chrawat, "mountaineers".

=== Cuba ===
Etymology unknown. First bestowed by Christopher Columbus as Cabo de Cuba (the modern Punta de Mulas) after a supposed local settlement named "Cuba", probably from the Taíno cubao ("abundant fertile land") or coabana ("great place").
Scholars who believe that Christopher Columbus was Portuguese rather than Genovese argue "Cuba" is derived from the town of Cuba near Beja in Portugal.

=== Cyprus ===
Etymology unknown. Latinized from the Greek Kúpros (Κύπρος), first attested as Mycenaean Greek (Kupirijo, "Cypriot"). Possible etymologies include the Greek kypárissos (κυπάρισσος, "cypress") or kýpros (κύπρος, "henna").
The most common folk etymology derives its name from "copper", since the island's extensive supply gave Greek and Latin words for the metal. Although these words derived from Cyprus rather than the other way around, the name has more recently been derived from an Eteocypriot word for "copper" and even from the Sumerian zubar ("copper") or kubar ("bronze").

=== Czechoslovakia ===
"Land of the Czechs and Slovaks". For further etymology of "Czech", see Czech Republic below; for further etymology of "Slovak", see Slovakia below.

=== Czech Republic ===
Self-descriptive, adopted upon the Velvet Divorce in 1993. The name "Czech" derives from the archaic Czech endonym Czech or Cžech, a member of the West Slavic tribe whose Přemyslid dynasty subdued its neighbors in Bohemia around AD 900. Its further etymology is disputed. The traditional etymology derives it from an eponymous leader Čech who led the tribe into Bohemia. Modern theories consider it an obscure derivative, e.g. from četa, a medieval military unit.

Czechia, a less common alternate name: A Latinized version of the Czech endonym Czechy.
Bohemia, a former name: "Land of the Boii", a Celtic tribe of the region. The ultimate etymology of Boii is uncertain, but has been connected to Proto-Indo-European roots meaning "cow" and "warrior". Now refers only to the area of Bohemia proper.
Czechy or Čechy, a former endonym: "Land of the Czechs" in archaic Czech. Now typically considered to refer only to the area of Bohemia proper, excluding Moravia and other areas.
Česko, a current endonym: "Land of the Czechs" in modern Czech. Although it appeared as early as the 18th century, Česko remained uncommon enough that most Czechs only associated it with its appearance in the Czech name for Czechoslovakia (Česko-Slovensko or Československo) a number of Czechs resisted the use of it following the division of the country. Given the inability to use the former name Čechy either. The name Česko has got on and it is nowadays commonly used in the Czech language as the short name of Czechia.

== D ==
=== Denmark ===
Etymology uncertain, but probably "The Danish forest" or "march" in reference to the forests of southern Schleswig. First attested in Old English as Denamearc in Alfred's translation of Paulus Orosius's Seven Books of History against the Pagans. The etymology of "Danes" is uncertain, but has been derived from the proposed Proto-Indo-European root *dhen ("low, flat"); -mark from the proposed Proto-Indo-European root *mereg- ("edge, boundary") via Old Norse merki ("boundary") or more probably mǫrk ("borderland, forest").
The former folk etymology derived the name from an eponymous king Dan of the region.

=== Djibouti ===
Etymology unknown, named for its eponymous capital Djibouti, founded in 1888 by the French pirate Éloi Pino and the capital of the previous French colonies French Somaliland and Afars & Issas. a French transliteration for "Land of Tehuti", after the ancient Egyptian moon god.

French Somaliland, a former name: From its position near today's Somaliland, distinguishing it from British Somaliland and Italian Somaliland. For the further etymology of France and Somalia, see below here and here.
Afars and Issas, a former name: From the country's two main ethnic groups, the Afars and Issas.

=== Dominica ===
"Sunday Island" in Latin, feminized from diēs Dominicus ("Sunday", lit. "Lordly Day"), possibly via Spanish Domingo, for the day of the island's sighting by Christopher Columbus on 3 November 1493. At the time of Dominica's discovery, there was no special saint's day on that date and Columbus's own father had been named Domenego.

Wai'tu Kubuli, a former endonym: "Tall is her body" in the local Carib dialect.

=== Dominican Republic ===
"Republic of Santo Domingo", the capital city of the Spanish-held region of Hispaniola since its incorporation by Bartholomew Columbus on 5 August 1498 as La Nueva Isabela, Santo Domingo del Puerto de la Isla de la Española ("New Isabela, Saint Dominic of the Port of Hispaniola") either in honor of Sunday (see Dominica above), his father Domenego, or Saint Dominic's feast day on 4 August. Nicolás de Ovando shortened the name to Santo Domingo de Guzmán upon the city's refounding at a new site after a major hurricane in 1502. Dominic himself was named for Saint Dominic of Silos, the monk at whose shrine his mother was said to have prayed. Dominic (from the Latin Dominicus, "lordly" or "belonging to the Lord") was a common name for children born on Sunday (see "Dominica" above) and for religious names.

Hispaniola, a former name: "Spanish [island]", Latinized by Peter Martyr d'Anghiera from Bartolomé de las Casas's truncated Spanish Española, from the original La Isla Española ("Spanish Island") bestowed by Christopher Columbus in 1492. Replaced by the Royal Audiencia of Santo Domingo theoretically in 1511 and actually in 1526.
Spanish Haiti, a former name: Self-descriptive, translated from the Spanish name República del Haití Español chosen upon independence in 1821. The "Spanish" distinguished it from the adjacent French-speaking Haiti. For further etymology of "Haiti", see below.
Ozama and Cibao, a former name: From the French Départements de l'Ozama et du Cibao, from the Taíno cibao ("abounding in rocks", referring to the island's Central Range) and the Ozama River, from Taíno ozama ("wetlands", "navigable waters").

== E ==
=== East Timor ===
"Eastern East [Island]", from the Portuguese Timor-Leste ("East Timor"), in reference to the state's position on the eastern half of the island of Timor, whose name derives from the Malay timur ("east"), from its position in the Lesser Sundas.

Portuguese Timor, a former name: As above, with the addition of its colonizer to distinguish it from Dutch and later Indonesian Timor on the western half of the island. For further etymology of Portugal, see below.
Timor-Leste, an alternate name: "East Timor" in Portuguese. In the official name, Republica Democratica de Timor-Leste (Democratic Republic of East Timor).

=== Ecuador ===
"Equator" in Spanish, truncated from the Spanish República del Ecuador (lit. "Republic of the Equator"), from the former Ecuador Department of Gran Colombia established in 1824 as a division of the former territory of the Royal Audience of Quito. Quito, which remained the capital of the department and republic, is located only about 40 kilometres (25 mi), ¼ of a degree, south of the equator.

Quito, a former name: "Quitus", after its capital Quito, truncated from the original Spanish "Santiago de Quito" and "San Francisco de Quito", after an Indigenous Andean tribe recently annexed to the Incan Empire at the time of its conquest by the Spanish.

=== Egypt ===
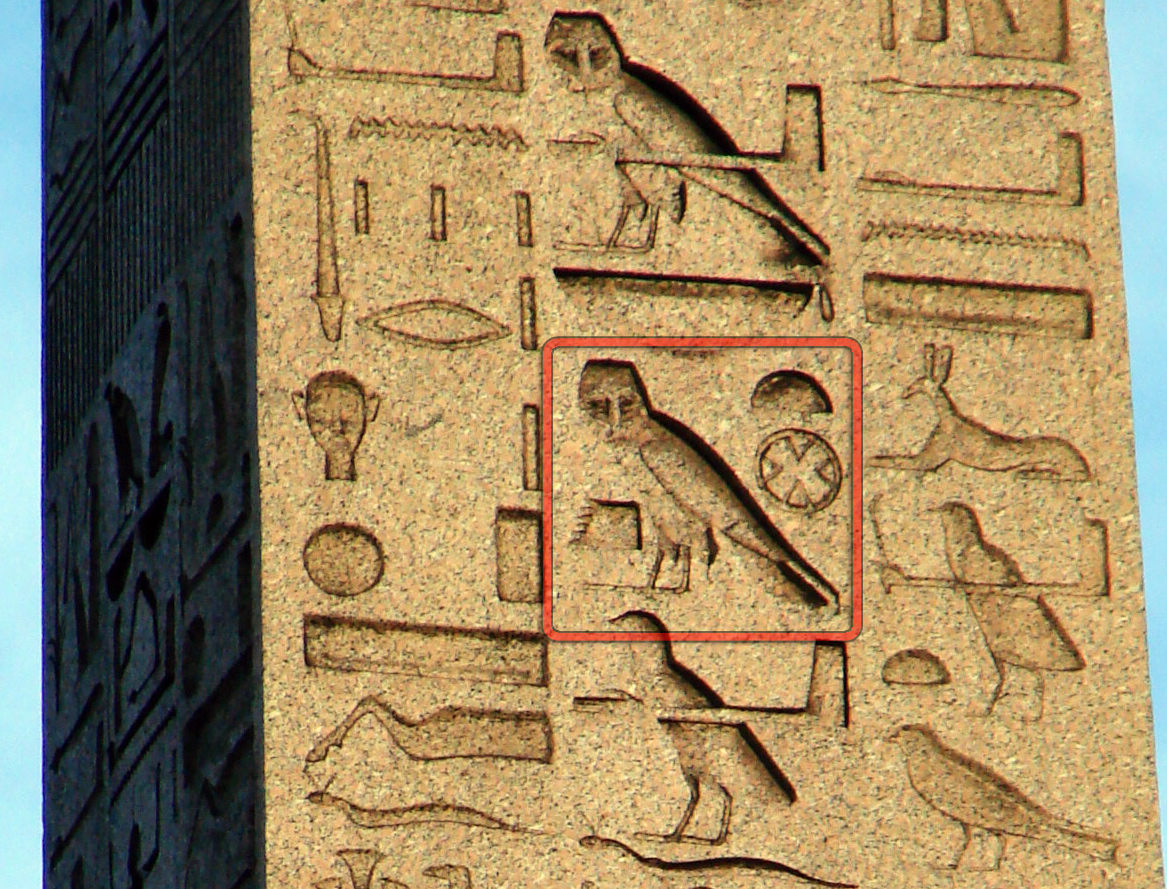
The Egyptian name Km.t appearing on the Luxor Obelisk in the Place de la Concorde, Paris.

"Home of the ka of Ptah", from Latin Aegyptus, from Greek Aígyptos (Αἴγυπτος), related to Mycenean *Aiguptiyós, derived from Egyptian ḥwt k3 ptḥ ( , *ḥei ko p'taḥ), an alternate name for Memphis, the capital of the Egyptian empire, by metonymy from the cult and temple of Ptah there. Ptah's name itself meant "opener", both in relation to his creation of the world and his role in the opening of the mouth ceremony.
Strabo recorded the Greek folk etymology that it derived from the Greek Aigaíou hyptíōs (Αἰγαίου ὑπτίως, "[land] below the Aegean").

Miṣr (Arabic pronunciation: [misˤɾ]; "مِصر") is the Classical Quranic Arabic and modern official name of Egypt, while "Maṣr" (Egyptian Arabic pronunciation: [mɑsˤɾ]; مَصر) is the local pronunciation in Egyptian Arabic. The current name of Egypt, Misr/Misir/Misru, stems from the Ancient Semitic name for it. The term originally connoted "Civilisation" or "Metropolis". Classical Arabic Miṣr (Egyptian Arabic Maṣr) is directly cognate with the Biblical Hebrew Miṣráyīm (מִצְרַיִם / מִצְרָיִם), meaning "the two straits", a reference to the predynastic separation of Upper and Lower Egypt. Also mentioned in several Semitic languages as Mesru, Misir and Masar. The oldest attestation of this name for Egypt is the Akkadian "mi-iṣ-ru" ("miṣru") related to miṣru/miṣirru/miṣaru, meaning "border" or "frontier". The Neo-Assyrian Empire used the derived term , Mu-ṣur.
Kumat, a former endonym: "Black Land", reconstructed from Egyptian kmt, distinguishing the Nile flood plain from the "Red Land" of the desert, later becoming Coptic Kīmi (Ⲭⲏⲙⲓ). A previous folk etymology related the name to the Biblical Ham.

=== El Salvador ===
"The Savior" in Spanish, a truncation of the original Provincia de Nuestro Señor Jesus Cristo, el Salvador del Mundo ("Province of our Lord Jesus Christ, the Savior of the World"), a territory within the Spanish Kingdom of Guatemala named for its capital La Ciudad de Gran San Salvador ("City of the Great Holy Savior"), founded around 1 April 1525, by Gonzalo de Alvarado, whose brother Pedro had previously instructed him to name a settlement in the territory of Cuzcatlan after the Feast of the Holy Savior.

Cuzcatlan, a former endonym: "Place of Diamonds", from the Nahuatl Kozkatlan.

=== Equatorial Guinea ===
Self-descriptive. Although the country's territory does not touch the equator, it straddles the line: the island Annobón lies to the south while the mainland is to the north. For further etymology of "Guinea", see below.

Spanish Guinea, a former name: See Spain and Guinea below.

=== Eritrea ===
"Land of the Red Sea", adopted in 1993 upon independence from Ethiopia, from the Italian colony established in 1890, named by Francesco Crispi on the suggestion of Carlo Dossi, Italicized from the Latin transcription Mare Erythræum of the Greek Erythrá Thálassa (Ἐρυθρά Θάλασσα, "Red Sea").

=== Estonia ===
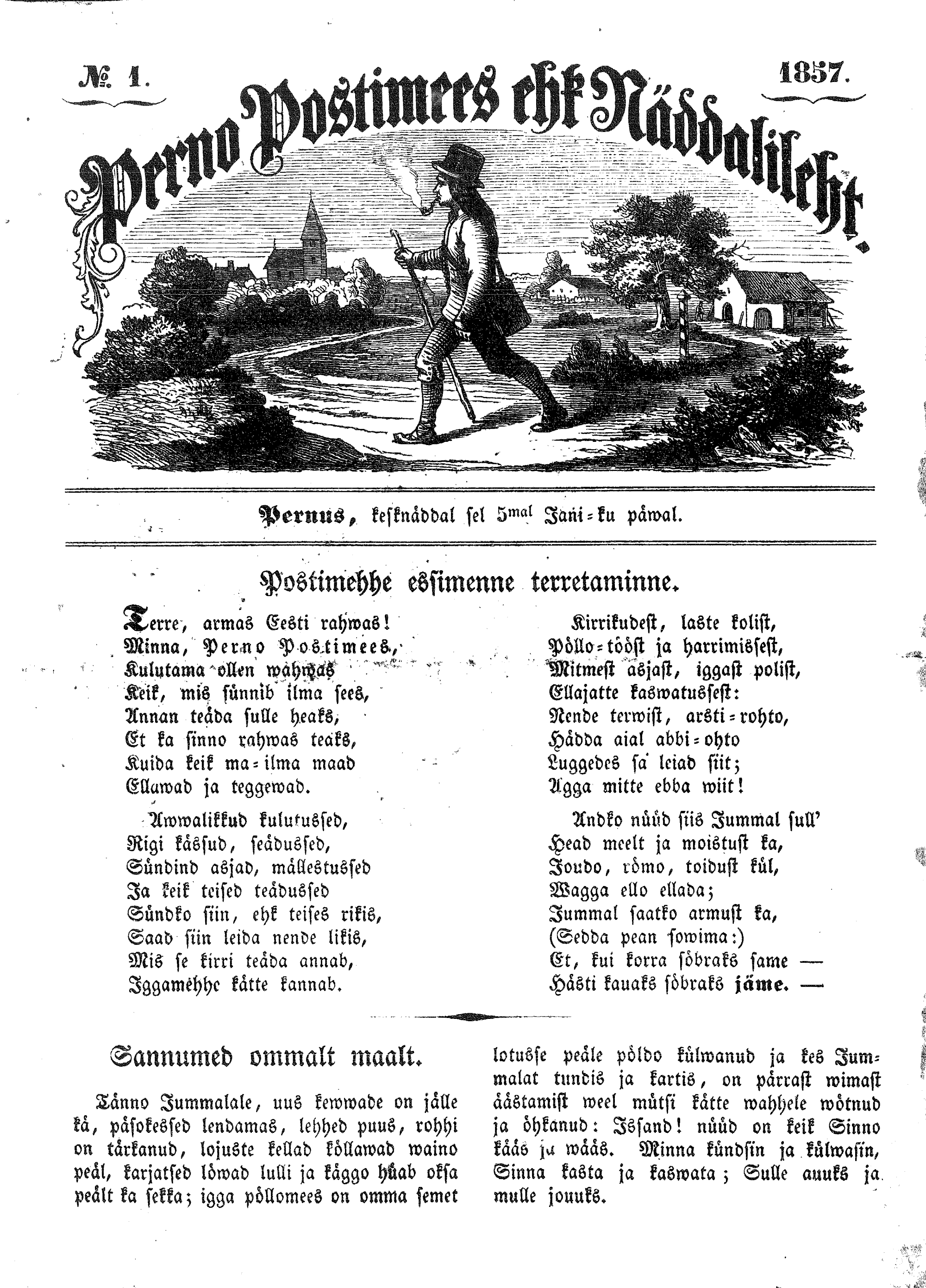
The first issue of the Perno Postimees in 1857 popularized the Estonian loaned endonym Eesti. The first sentence reads Terre, armas Eesti rahwas! ("Hello, dear people of Estonia!")

"Land of the Aesti", a correction of earlier Esthonia, a re-Latinization of the Old English Estland, a development of the Old High German Aestland, a combination of the Latin Aestia and the German -land ("-land"). The name Aestia was a combination of the Latin Aesti and the locative suffix -ia, meaning "Land of the Aesti" (a people first mentioned by Ancient Roman historian Tacitus around 98 AD). Some historians have hypothesized that he was referring to speakers of Baltic languages and, not their then Finnic-speaking neighbours to the north, while others have suggested that the name Aesti may have been at earlier times applied to the entire Eastern Baltic region. The Scandinavian sagas' references to Eistland are the earliest known sources using the toponym indisputably for a geographic area overlapping with modern Estonia. The word Estland/Eistland has been linked to Old Norse eist, austr meaning "the east".

The Estonian endonym Eesti was first attested in writing as Estimah in 1638, as a combination of the name Est- and the word -mah ("land"), which is still used as an alternative name Eestimaa in modern Standard Estonian.

The Finnish name Viro is derived from the northeast Estonian Viru County, which was closest to Finns along the shore. Similar names can be found in other Northern Finnic languages.

The Latvian name Igaunija and Latgallian name Igauneja are derived from the Southeastern Estonian Ugandi County.

=== Eswatini ===
"Land of the Swazi", an ethnic group. The name Swazi itself derives from Mswati II, a former king of Swaziland.

Swaziland, a former name: Self-descriptive, the English translation of the above.

=== Ethiopia ===
"Land of the Blacks", from Latin Æthiopia, from the Ancient Greek Αἰθιοπία (Aithiopía), "land of the Burnt-Faced" (from Αἰθίοψ, Aithíops), originally in reference to all Sub-Saharan Africa.
An Ethiopian folk etymology recorded in the Book of Aksum traces the name to an "'Ityopp'is", supposed to be a son of Cush.

Dʿmt or Damot, a former name: Unknown etymology, reconstructed from the proto-Ge'ez and Ge'ez Dʿmt (Ge'ez: ደዐመተ).

Kingdom of Aksum or Axum, a former name: Uncertain meaning, from the capital Axum (Ge'ez: አክሱም) of unknown etymology.

Abyssinia, a former name: Uncertain meaning. Latinized in 1735 from a Portuguese corruption Abassia of the Arabic al-Ḥabašah (الحبشة), from Ge'ez Ḥabbaśā (ሐበሻ) or Ḥabaśā (ሐበሣ), first attested in 2nd- or 3rd-century engravings as Ḥbś or Ḥbštm (ሐበሠ), of unknown origin. Possibly related to the 15th-century-BC Egyptian Ḫbstjw, a foreign people of the incense-producing regions.

== F ==
=== Fiji ===
Possibly "look-out". Adapted from Fisi, the Tongan form of Viti, referring to the island of Viti Levu (Fijian for "Great Viti"). Popularized by British explorer James Cook.

=== Finland ===
"Land of the Finns", from the Swedish spelling, first attested in runestones in Old Norse in present-day Sweden. Early mentions of the Fenni in Tacitus's first-century Germania and the Phinnoi (Ancient Greek: Φιννοι) in Ptolemy's second-century Geography are today thought to refer to the modern Sami people. The etymology of "Finn" is uncertain: it may derive from Germanic translations of the Finnish suo ("fen") or from the proposed Proto-Germanic *finne "wanderers", "hunting-folk".
Suomi, the endonym and exonym in some other Finnic and Baltic languages: Uncertain etymology. Possibly derived from the proposed proto-Balto-Slavic *zeme "land" or from the Finnish suomaa ("fen land").

=== France ===
"Land of the Franks", Anglicized from Late Latin Francia, from Old Frankish Franko. The name "Frank" itself has been derived from the historic framea ("javelin"), proposed Proto-Germanic *frankon ("spear", "javelin"), – although the characteristic weapons of the Franks were the sword and the Frankish axe – and from the Proto-Germanic *frankisc ("free") from *frank ("free") – although they were not masters until after their conquest of Gaul.

Gallia, a former name: "Land of the Celts", from Latin Gallia, of uncertain etymology. Possible derivations include an eponymous river or a minor tribe reconstructed as *Gal(a)-to- whose name was cognate with the Proto-Celtic *galno- ("power", "strength").
Gaul, a former name: "Land of Foreigners", from French Gaule, from Proto-Germanic *Walhaz, originally meaning "Volcae" but eventually simply "foreigner".

== G ==
=== Gabon ===
"Cloak", Anglicized from the Portuguese Gabão, bestowed on the Komo River estuary for its supposed resemblance to a gabão, a kind of pointy-hooded overcoat whose name derives from the Arabic qabā' (قباء).

=== The Gambia ===
"Kaabu", selected upon independence in 1965 from the name of the former British colony, named for the Gambia River, from a corruption of the Portuguese Gambra and Cambra first recorded in 1455 by Alvise Cadamosto, a corruption of a local name Kambra or Kambaa (Mandinkan: "Kaabu river") or Gambura, an amalgam of Mandinkan Kaabu and Wolof bur ("king").
A folk etymology traces the word from the Portuguese câmbio ("trade", "exchange"), from the region's extensive involvement in the slave trade.

=== Georgia ===
Etymology uncertain. The terms "Georgia" and "Georgian" appeared in Western Europe in early medieval annals. At the time, the name was folk etymologized – for instance, by the French chronicler Jacques de Vitry and the "English" fraudster John Mandeville – from a supposed especial reverence of the Saint George. According to several modern scholars, "Georgia" seems to have been borrowed in the 11th or 12th century from the Syriac Gurz-ān or -iyān and Arabic Ĵurĵan or Ĵurzan, derived from the New Persian Gurğ or Gurğān, itself stemming from the Ancient Iranian and Middle Persian Vrkān or Waručān of uncertain origin, but resembling the eastern trans-Caspian toponym Gorgan, from the Middle Persian Varkâna ("land of the wolves"). This might have been of the same etymology as the Armenian Virk' (Վիրք) and a source of the classical Iberi (Ancient Greek: Ἴβηρες, Ibēres).
Another theory semantically links "Georgia" to Greek geōrgós (γεωργός, "tiller of the land") and Latin georgicus ("agricultural"). The Georgi mentioned by Pliny the Elder and Pomponius Mela. were agricultural tribes distinguished as such from their pastoral neighbors across the Panticapaeum in Taurica.

Sakartvelo, the local endonym: "Place for Kartvelians" in Georgian, from Kartli (ქართლი), attested in the 5th-century Martyrdom of the Holy Queen Shushanik, possibly from a cognate with the Mingrelian karta (ქართა, "cattle pen", "enclosed place"). Traditionally taken by the Georgian Chronicles as referring to Kartlos, an eponymous ancestor who supposedly built a city Kartli on the Mtkvari River near modern Armazi.
Iberia, a former name: Latinized from Greek Ibēría (Ἰβηρία), possibly from Virk' as above.

=== Germany ===
Meaning uncertain. German attested 1520, Anglicized from Latin Germania, attested in the 3rd century BC, popularized by Julius Caesar as a reference to all tribes east of the Rhine, and repopularized in Europe following the rediscovery and publication of Tacitus's Germania in 1455. Proposed derivations include the Celtic gair- ("neighbor"), gairm ("battle-cry") or *gar ("to shout"), and gar ("spear").

Deutschland, the local endonym: "The People's Land", from Old High German diutisciu land, from the Germanic *þiudiskaz (sometimes translated as "vernacular", as opposed to Latin and Romance languages like Old French), a form of *þeudō, from the proposed Proto-Indo-European *tewtéh₂ ("people").
Niemcy, the Polish term for Germany, Niemcy coming from the word niemy meaning mute, possibly as the populations did not understand each other at all due to germanic and slavic language differences.

=== Ghana ===
"Warrior King", adopted at J. B. Danquah's suggestion upon the union of Gold Coast with British Togoland in 1956 or upon independence on 6 March 1957, in homage to the earlier Malian Ghana Empire, named for the title of its ruler. Despite the empire never holding territory near the current nation, traditional stories connect the northern Mande of Ghana – the Soninke, Dyula, Ligby, and Bissa – to peoples displaced following the collapse of the old Ghana.

Togoland and British Togoland, former names: See Togo below.
Gold Coast, a former name: Self-descriptive. Compare the names Europeans gave to nearby stretches of shore, as Côte d'Ivoire above.

=== Kingdom of Great Britain ===
See etymology of "Great Britain" under the United Kingdom below.

=== Greece ===
Etymology uncertain. From Old English Grecas and Crecas, from Latin Græcus, presumably from Greek Graikoí (Γραικοί). The Romans were said to have called all the Greeks after the name of the first group they met, although the location of that tribe varies between Epirus – Aristotle recorded that the Illyrians used the name for Dorian Epiriots from their native name Graii – and Cumae – Eusebius of Caesarea dated its settlement by Boeotians from Pithecusae led by Megasthenes and Hippocles to 1050 BC. The town of Graea (Γραῖα Graîa) in or near Oropos, Boeotia, appeared in Homer's Catalogue of Ships and was said to be the oldest in Greece, and the Parian Chronicle lists Graikoí as the original name of the Greeks. The town and its region (Γραϊκή, Graïkē) have been derived from the word γραῖα graia "old woman" which in its turn comes from the Proto-Indo-European language root *ǵerh_{2}-/*ǵreh_{2}-, "to grow old" via Proto-Greek *gera-/grau-iu; the same root later gave γέρας geras (/keras/), "gift of honour" in Mycenean Greek.
Folk etymology linked the name with an eponymous patriarch Graecus, related to Hellen below.

Hellás, the local endonym: Etymology unknown. Modern Greek Elláda (Ελλάδα) and classical Hellás (Ἑλλάς) both derive from Greek Hellēn (Ἓλλην), which Aristotle traced the name to a region in Epirus between Dodona and the Achelous, where the Selloi (possibly "sacrificers") were said to be priests of Dodonian Zeus and operators of the first oracle.
Folk etymology linked the name with an eponymous patriarch Hellen (completely distinct from the female Helen of Troy), said to be the son of Deucalion and Pyrrha and to have originated in Thessalic Phthia. Achilleus commanded their forces at Troy. His brother Amphictyon was said to have founded the Great Amphictyonic League, which banded 12 city-states together to protect the temples of Apollo at Delphi and of Demeter at Anthele.

=== Grenada ===
"Granada", from its French name La Grenade, from earlier Spanish Granada, whose own name derived from the Emirate and Taifa of Granada, named for their capital Gharnāṭah (Arabic: غَرْنَاطَة), originally a Jewish suburb (Garnata al-Yahud) of Elvira which became the principal settlement after the latter was destroyed in 1010.

Concepción, a former name: "Conception", bestowed by Christopher Columbus upon his discovery of the island in 1498. Its hostile Carib natives, however, limited colonization until the name had fallen from use.

=== Guatemala ===
"Forest", from the Nahuatl Cuauhtēmallān (lit. "Place of Many Trees"), a translation of the K'iche' K'ii'chee' (lit. "Many Trees").

=== Guinea ===
Etymology uncertain. Anglicized from Portuguese Guiné, traditionally derived from a corruption of Ghana above, originally in reference to the interior and applied to the coast only after 1481. Alternate theories include a corruption of Djenné and the Berber ghinawen, aginaw, or aguinaou ("burnt one", i.e. "black").

French Guinea, a former name: As above, from the French Guinée française, a renaming of Rivières du Sud in 1894. For further etymology of "France", see above.
Rivières du Sud, a former name: "Southern Rivers" in French.
Guinea-Conakry, an alternate name: As above. Conakry, the capital, is traditionally derived from an amalgam of Baga Cona, a wine producer, and Sosso nakiri ("other side" or "shore").

=== Guinea-Bissau ===
Etymology of Guinea is uncertain. The Portuguese name of República da Guiné-Bissau was adopted officially upon independence in 1973.

Portuguese Guinea, a former name: As above. For further etymology of "Portugal", see below.

=== Guyana ===
"Land of Many Waters" in an indigenous language.

British Guiana, a former name: As above. For further etymology of "Britain", see United Kingdom below.

== H ==
=== Haiti ===
From Taíno/Arawak, Hayiti or Hayti, meaning "mountainous land", originally Hayiti. The name derives from the mountainous and hilly landscape of the western half of the island of Hispaniola.
- Hispaniola (name of the island shared by Haiti and the Dominican Republic) – a Latinization of the Spanish name La Española, meaning "The Spanish (island)", a name given to the island by Columbus in 1492.

=== Honduras ===
Christopher Columbus named the country "Honduras", Spanish for "depths", referring to the deep waters off the northern coast.

=== Hungary ===
Turkic: on-ogur, "(people of the) ten arrows" – in other words, "alliance of the ten tribes". Byzantine chronicles gave this name to the Hungarians; the chroniclers mistakenly assumed that the Hungarians had Turkic origins, based on their Turkic-nomadic customs and appearance, despite the Uralic language of the people. The Hungarian tribes later actually formed an alliance of the seven Hungarian and three Khazarian tribes, but the name is from before then, and first applied to the original seven Hungarian tribes. The ethnonym Hunni (referring to the Huns) has influenced the Latin (and English) spelling.
- Ugry (Угры, Old East Slavic), Uhorshchyna (Угорщина, Ukrainian), Vengrija (Lithuanian), Vengry, Vengriya (Венгры, Венгрия, Russian), Vuhorščyna (Вугоршчына, Belarusian), Wędżierskô (Kashubian), and Węgry (Polish): also from Turkic "on-ogur", see above. The same root emerges in the ethnonym Yugra in Siberia, inhabited by Khanty and Mansi people, the closest relatives to Hungarians in the Uralic language family.
- Magyarország (native name – "land of the Magyars"), and derivatives, e.g. Czech/Slovak Maďarsko, Serbo-Croatian Mađarska, Turkish Macaristan: magyar 'Hungarian' + ország 'land, country'. Magyar is likely a compound of parts either extinct, or extant for long back only as components of compounds: the antecedent may have been an ancient Ugric *mańćɜ, cf. Mansi mäńćī 'Manshi; unchristened child', måńś 'joint endonym for the Khanty and the Mansi', Khanty mańt 'the name of one of the Khanty alliances of tribes'. The posterior constituent is the independently not used word er, going back to ancient Finno-Ugric *irkä 'man, boy', found in modern Hungarian ember 'man', férj 'husband', némber 'woman without respectable qualities'; cf. Mari erγe 'boy', Finnish yrkö 'man'. In Hungarian, after the dimming of it having been made up of constituent parts, and due to the action of wovel harmony present in Hungarian, magyeri, magyer became magyar. Ország comes from the old uru form of úr 'lord, master', affixed with derivational suffix '-szág' (alternative of '-ság'). According to unsubstantiated legend, recounted in the chronicle of Simon of Kéza (Gesta Hunnorum et Hungarorum, 1282), Magyar (Magor), the forefather of all Hungarians, had a brother named Hunor (the ancestor of the Huns); their father king Menrot, equates to the Nimrod, builder of the tower of Babel, of the Hebrew Bible.

== I ==
=== Iceland ===
"Land of Ice", from Old Norse Ísland, from íss ("ice"). Owing to the reports on the origin of the name Greenland, Iceland has been folk etymologized to have arisen as an attempt to dissuade outsiders from attempting to settle the land. However, according to the Landnámabók, the early explorer and settler Flóki Vilgerðarson gave the island the name after spotting "a firth [or fjord] full of drift ice" to the north. According to various alternative but not widely accepted theories, such as those advanced by pyramidologist Adam Rutherford or writer Einar Pálsson (in his book The Celtic Heritage,) the origin of the name Ís-land lies either with the ancient Egyptian goddess Isis or with Jesus.

=== India ===
"Land of the Indus River" in Latin, from Greek Ινδία, from Old Persian Hinduš (𐎢𐎯𐎴𐎡𐏃), the Old Persian name of the Sindh Province, ultimately derived from Sanskrit Sindhu (सिन्धु), the original name of the Indus River

Bharat (भारतम्), a native name: Sanskrit, commonly derived from the name of either of two legendary kings named Bharata (Dushyanta's son Bharata and/or Rishabha's son Bharata). However, it is in reference to the entire Indian subcontinent.
Hindustan (हिंदुस्तान), a native & former name: "Land of Sind", from Hindi, from Persian Hindustān (هندوستان), a compound of Hind (هند, "Sind") and -stan ("land", see Afghanistan above). The terms "Hind" and "Hindustan" were used interchangeably from the 11th century by Muslim rulers such as the Mughal Emperors and used by the Government of India during the British Raj era alongside "India" to refer to the entire subcontinent including modern-day India, Pakistan, Bangladesh, and for specifically the northern region surrounding the Indo-Gangetic Plain since the 19th century.
Āryāvarta (आर्यावर्त), a native name: Sanskrit for "land of Aryans"

=== Indonesia ===
"Indian Islands" in Greek (Ινδονησία), apparently invented in the mid-19th century to mean "Indies Islands", from the islands' previous name "East Indies".

Nederlands Oost-Indië, a former name, from 17th to 20th century
Dutch East Indies, a former name: a translation of the Dutch
Hindia-Belanda, a former name: the Indonesian form of the Dutch name above.

=== Iran ===
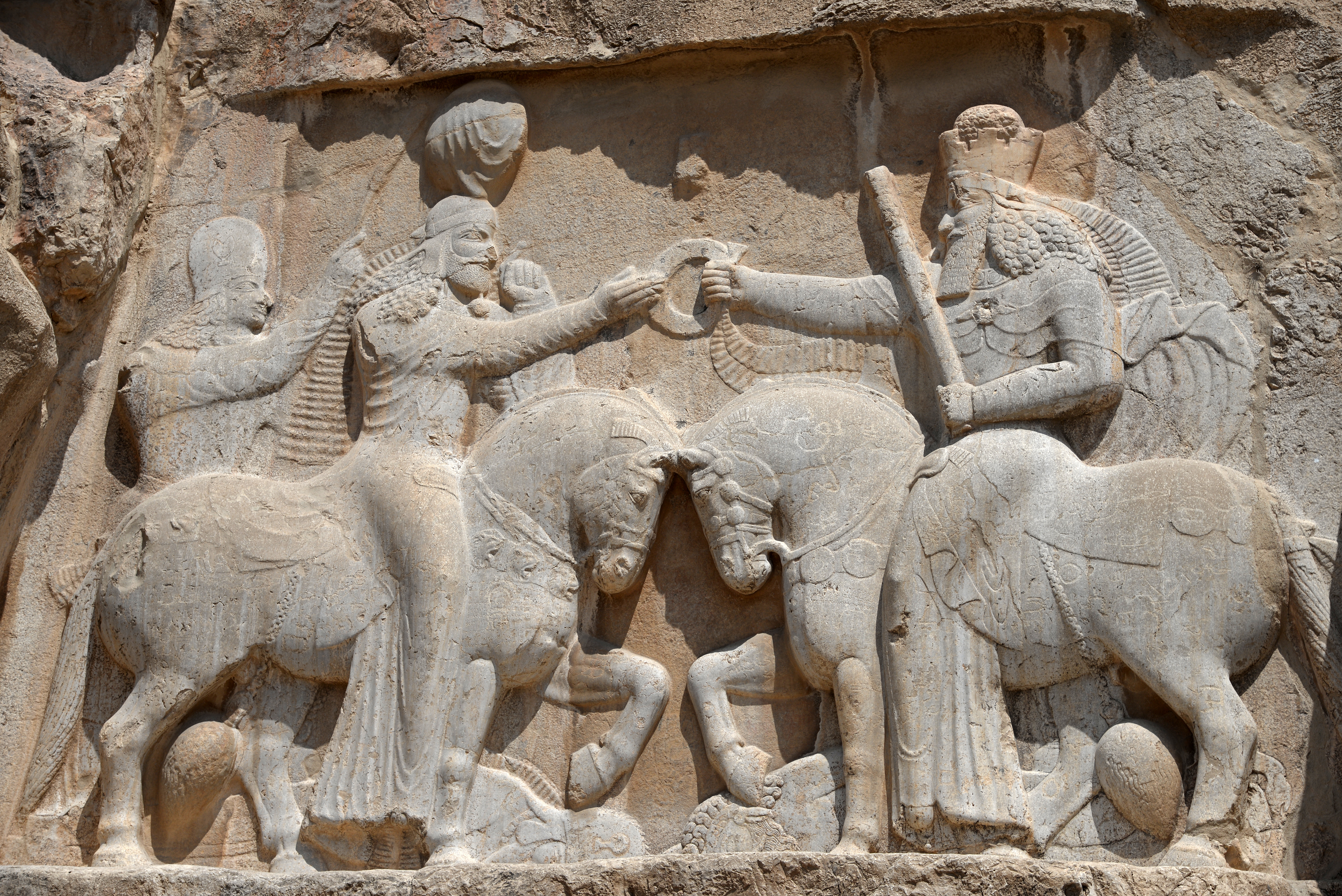
Ahura Mazda and Ardashir I - Iranshar (Ērānshahr or Īrānshahr) the Sasanian Empire

"Land of the Aryans" or "land of the free". The term "Arya" is from a Proto Indo-Iranian root, generally meaning "noble" or "free", cognate with the Greek-derived word "aristocrat".
- Persia (former name): from Latin, via Greek Περσίς Persis, from Old Persian 𐎱𐎠𐎼𐎿 Pārsa, originally the name of Persis (modern-day Fars or Pars), a place name of a central district within the region. A common Hellenic folk-etymology derives "Persia" from "Land of Perseus".
- The Modern Persian word Īrān (ایران) derives immediately from Middle Persian Ērān (Pahlavi spelling: ʼyrʼn), first attested in an inscription that accompanies the investiture relief of the first Sassanid king Ardashir I at Naqsh-e Rustam.

=== Iraq ===
The prevailing theory is that it is derived from the city of Erech/Uruk (also known as "Warka") near the river Euphrates. Some archaeologists regard Uruk as the first major Sumerian city. However, it is more plausible that name is derived from the Middle Persian word Ērāg, meaning "lowlands". The natives of the southwestern part of today's Iran called their land "the Persian Iraq" for centuries (for Arabs: Iraq 'ajami: non-Arabic-speaking Iraq). Before the constitution of the state of Iraq, the term "Iraq arabi" referred to the region around Baghdad and Basra.
- Mesopotamia (ancient name and Greek variant): a loan-translation (Greek meso- (between) and potamos (river), meaning "Between the Rivers") of the ancient Semitic Bayn al-Naḥrayn, "Land of two Rivers", referring to the Tigris and Euphrates rivers.

=== Ireland ===
After "Éire" from Proto-Celtic *Φīweriyū, "the fertile place" or "Place of Éire (Ériu)", a Celtic fertility goddess. Often mistakenly derived as "Land of Iron"; may come from a reflex of Proto-Indo-European *arya, or from variations of the Irish word for "west" (Modern Irish iar, iarthar).
- Hibernia (ancient name and Latin variant): apparently assimilated to Latin hibernus ("wintry") from earlier Ivernia (given in Ptolemy's Geographia as Ἰουερνία), from the above Celtic name.
- Ireland is known as Èirinn in Scottish Gaelic, from the dative case of Old Irish Ériu. In the fellow Celtic languages: in Welsh it is Iwerddon; in Cornish it is Ywerdhon or Worthen; and in Breton it is Iwerzhon.
- In Gaelic bardic tradition Ireland is also known by the poetical names of Banbha and Fódhla. In Gaelic myth, Ériu, Banba and Fódla were three goddesses who greeted the Milesians upon their arrival in Ireland, and who granted them custody of the island.

=== Israel ===
"El(God) persists/rules".
"Israel" and related terms "the people of Israel" ('Am Isra'el עם יִשְׂרָאֵל) and "the Children of Israel" (Benei Isra'el בני יִשְׂרָאֵל) have referred to the Jewish People in its literature from antiquity. The name Isra'el (יִשְׂרָאֵל – literally: "will Struggle with God"), originates from the Hebrew Bible as an appellation given to the biblical patriarch Jacob. According to the account in the Book of Genesis, Jacob wrestled with an angel at a river ford and won – through perseverance. God then changed his name to Israel, signifying that he had deliberated with God and won, as he had wrestled and won with men.

=== Italy ===
From the mythological figure of Italus.
From Latin Ītalia, itself from Greek Ἰταλία, from the ethnic name Ἰταλός, plural Ἰταλοί, originally referring to an early population in the southern part of Calabria. That ethnic name probably directly relates to a word ἰταλός (italós, "bull"), quoted in an ancient Greek gloss by Hesychius (from his collection of 51,000 unusual, obscure and foreign words). This "Greek" word is assumed to be a cognate of Latin vitulus ("calf"), although the different length of the i is a problem. The Latin vitulus is presumably derived from the Proto-Indo-European root *wet- meaning "year" (hence, a "yearling": a "one-year-old calf"), although the change of e to i is unexplained. The "Greek" word, however, is glossed as "bull", not "calf". Speakers of ancient Oscan called Italy Víteliú, a cognate of Greek Ἰταλία and Latin Ītalia. Varro wrote that the region got its name from the excellence and abundance of its cattle. Some disagree with that etymology. Compare Italus.
- Friagi or Friaz' (Old East Slavic): from the Byzantine appellation for the medieval Franks.
- Valland (variant in Icelandic): "Land of Valer" (an Old Norse name for Celts, later also used for the Romanized tribes).
- Włochy (Polish) and Olaszország (Hungarian): from Gothic walh, the same root as in Valland and Wallachia.

== J ==
=== Jamaica ===
Taíno/Arawak Xaymaca or Hamaica, "Land of wood and water".

=== Japan ===
From Geppun, Marco Polo's Italian rendition of the islands' Shanghainese name 日本 (Mandarin pinyin: rìběn, Shanghainese pronunciation: Nyih4 Pen2, at the time approximately jitpun), or "sun-origin", i.e. "Land of the Rising Sun", indicating Japan as lying to the east of China (where the sun rises). Also formerly known as the "Empire of the Sun".
- Nihon / Nippon: Japanese name, from the Onyomi (Sino-Japanese) pronunciation of the same characters as above.

=== Jordan ===
After the river Jordan, the name of which possibly derives from the Hebrew and Canaanite root ירד yrd – "descend" (into the Dead Sea). The river Jordan forms part of the border between Jordan and Israel/West Bank.

Transjordan (former name): Trans means "across" or "beyond", i.e. east of the river Jordan.
Urdun (Arabic), literal translation of name Jordan, sometimes spelled Urdan.

== K ==
=== Kazakhstan ===
"Land of the Kazakhs", an amalgam of Kazakh qazaq (Қазақ, 'nomad', 'free') and Persian -stan (ستان 'land').

=== Kenya ===
After Mount Kenya, probably from the Kikuyu Kere Nyaga ("White Mountain").
- British East Africa (former name): after its geographical position on the continent of Africa and the former colonial power, (Britain).
See also Britain, above, and Africa on the Place name etymology page.

From the Kikuyu word Kirinyaga a contraction of Kirima nyaga "Ostrich mountain", so called because the dark shadows and snow-capped peak resemble the plumage of a male Ostrich. The neighbouring Kamba tribe do not have the "R" and "G" sound in their language and called it "Keinya" when acting as guides to a German explorer. It is often erroneously believed it comes from Kirima Ngai "Mountain of God"

=== Kiribati ===
An adaptation of "Gilbert", from the former European name the "Gilbert Islands". pronounced [ˈkiɾibas].

Gilbert Islands (former name): named after the British Captain Thomas Gilbert, who sighted the islands in 1788.

=== Korea (North and South) ===
From "Gaoli", Marco Polo's Italian rendition of Gāo Lí (Chinese: 高麗), the Chinese name for Goryeo (918–1392), which had named itself after the earlier Goguryeo (37 BC–AD 668). The original name was a combination of the adjective go (고; 高) meaning "lofty" and a local Yemaek tribe, whose original name is thought to have been either Guru (구루, "walled city") or Gauri (가우리, "center").

South Koreans call Korea Hanguk (한국), an early 20th century neologism derived from the name "Samhan", referring to the Three Kingdoms of Korea.
North Koreans as well as ethnic Koreans living in China and Japan call it Chosŏn (조선) from Gojoseon (?–108 BC).

=== Kosovo ===
From the Serbian word Kosovo, derived from Kosovo Polje, the central Kosovo plain, and literally means "Field of Blackbird", since "kos" is "a blackbird" and "-ovo" is regular Serbian suffix for possessive adjectives.

In Hungarian it is Rigómező, which means "field of the thrush"

=== Kuwait ===
From the Arabic diminutive form of كوت (Kut or Kout), meaning "fortress built near water".

=== Kyrgyzstan ===
"Land of the forty tribes", from three words: kyrg (kırk) meaning "forty", yz (uz) meaning "tribes" in East-Turkic, and -stan meaning "land" in Persian.

== L ==
=== Laos ===
Coined under French rule, derived from Lao lao (ລາວ), meaning "a Laotian" or "Laotian", possibly originally from an ancient Indian word lava (लव). (Lava is the name of one of the twin sons of the god Rama; see History of Lahore.) The name might also be from Ai-Lao (Lao: ອ້າຽລາວ, Isan: อ้ายลาว, Chinese: 哀牢; pinyin: Āiláo, Vietnamese: ai lao), the old Chinese name for the Tai ethnic groups to which the Lao people belong. Formerly known as Lan Xang (ລ້ານຊ້າງ) or "land of a million elephants".
Lao: ເມືອງລາວ Muang Lao, lit. "Lao Country". The official name: Lao Democratic People's Republic; Lao: ສາທາລະນະລັດ ປະຊາທິປະໄຕ ປະຊາຊົນລາວ Sathalanalat Paxathipatai Paxaxon Lao

Chinese: 老挝 Lǎowō

=== Latvia ===
Emerged in the 19th century by combining ethnonym with finale -ija. The meaning and origin of name of Latvian people is unclear, however the root lat-/let- is associated with several Baltic hydronyms and might share common origin with the Liet- part of neighbouring Lithuania (Lietuva, see below) and name of Latgalians – one of the Baltic tribes that are considered ancestors of modern Latvian people.

=== Lebanon ===
The name Lebanon (لُبْنَان Lubnān in standard Arabic; Lebnan or Lebnèn in local dialect) is derived from the Semitic root "LBN", which is linked to several closely related meanings in various languages, such as "white" and "milk". This is regarded as a reference to the snow-capped Mount Lebanon, which is actually what the country was named after as it had previously been called Phoenicia, a prosperous ancient semitic civilization that hailed from the land in Modern day Lebanon. Occurrences of the name have been found in three of the twelve tablets of the Epic of Gilgamesh (2900 BC), the texts of the library of Ebla (2400 BC), and the Bible (71 times in the Bible's Old Testament).

=== Lesotho ===
"Land of the Basotho" or "of the Sesotho-speakers". Basotho itself is formed from the plural prefix ba- and Sotho of uncertain etymology, although possibly related to the word motho ("human being").
Basutoland: "Land of the Basotho", from an early anglicization of their name

=== Liberia ===
From the Latin liber meaning liberty or freedom, so named because the country was established as a homeland for freed (liberated) African-American slaves.

=== Libya ===
After an ancient Berber tribe called Libyans by the Greeks and Rbw by the Egyptians. Until the country's independence, the term "Libya" generally applied only to the vast desert between the Tripolitanian Lowland and the Fazzan plateau (to the west) and Egypt's Nile river valley (to the east). With "Tripoli" the name of new country's capital, and the old northeastern regional name "Cyrenaica" having passed into obsolescence, "Libya" became a convenient name for the country.

=== Liechtenstein ===
From the German "light stone" ("light" as in "bright"). The country took its name from the Liechtenstein dynasty, which purchased and united the counties of Schellenberg and Vaduz. The Holy Roman Emperor allowed the dynasty to rename the new property after itself.

=== Lithuania ===
Multiple theories: Some link it to the word lieti ("to consolidate" or "to unite"), referring to the first union of tribes in ethnic Lithuanian lands (not lands of Balts, but lands of ancient tribes of Lithuanians including Prussians, nowadays Latvians and Belarusians).
Alternatively, could be a hydronym, possibly from a small river Lietava in central Lithuania. That hydronym has been associated with Lithuanian lieti (root lie- "pour" or "spill"). Compare to Old Slavic liyati (лыиати "pour"), Greek a-lei-son (α-λει-σον "cup"), Latin litus ("seashore"), Tocharian A lyjäm ("lake").
Historically, attempts have been made to suggest a direct descendance from the Latin litus (see littoral). Litva (genitive: Litvae), an early Latin variant of the toponym, appears in a 1009 chronicle describing an archbishop "struck over the head by pagans on the border of Russia/Prussia and Litvae". A 16th-century scholar associated the word with the Latin word litus ("tubes") – a possible reference to wooden trumpets played by Lithuanian tribesmen.
A folkloric explanation is that the country's name in the Lithuanian language (Lietuva) is derived from a word lietus ("rain") and means "a rainy place".

=== Luxembourg ===
The country which was initially called (County of the) Ardennes named itself after its homonym capital city founded in 963.
From Celtic Lucilem "small", German lützel, OHG luc(c)il, luz(z)il (cognate to English "little") and Germanic Burg: "castle" or "fortress", thus Lucilemburg: "little castle" or "little fortress".

Later forms of the name were: Lütze(l)burg, Lëtzelburg (cf. Luxembourgish: Lëtzebuerg)
The evolution towards the originally French versions of the name using the letter X instead of C, TZ or TS (Luxembourg, Luxemburg), which were adopted by most languages (but not by Luxembourgish itself), was the result of the French cultural influence throughout Europe since the 17th century.

== M ==
=== Madagascar ===
From Madageiscar, a corruption of Mogadishu popularized by Marco Polo.

=== Malawi ===
Possibly based on a native word meaning "flaming water" or "tongues of fire", believed to have derived from the sun's dazzling reflections on Lake Malawi. But President Hastings Banda, the founding President of Malawi, reported in interviews that in the 1940s he saw a "Lac Maravi" shown in "Bororo" country on an antique French map titled "La Basse Guinee Con[t]enant Les Royaumes de Loango, de Congo, d'Angola et de Benguela" and he liked the name "Malawi" better than "Nyasa" (or "Maravi"). "Lac Marawi" does not necessarily correspond to today's Lake Malawi. Banda had such influence at the time of independence in 1964 that he named the former Nyasaland "Malawi", and the name stuck.
- Nyasaland (former name): Nyasa literally means "lake" in the local indigenous languages. The name applied to Lake Malawi, formerly Lake Nyasa (Niassa).

=== Malaysia ===
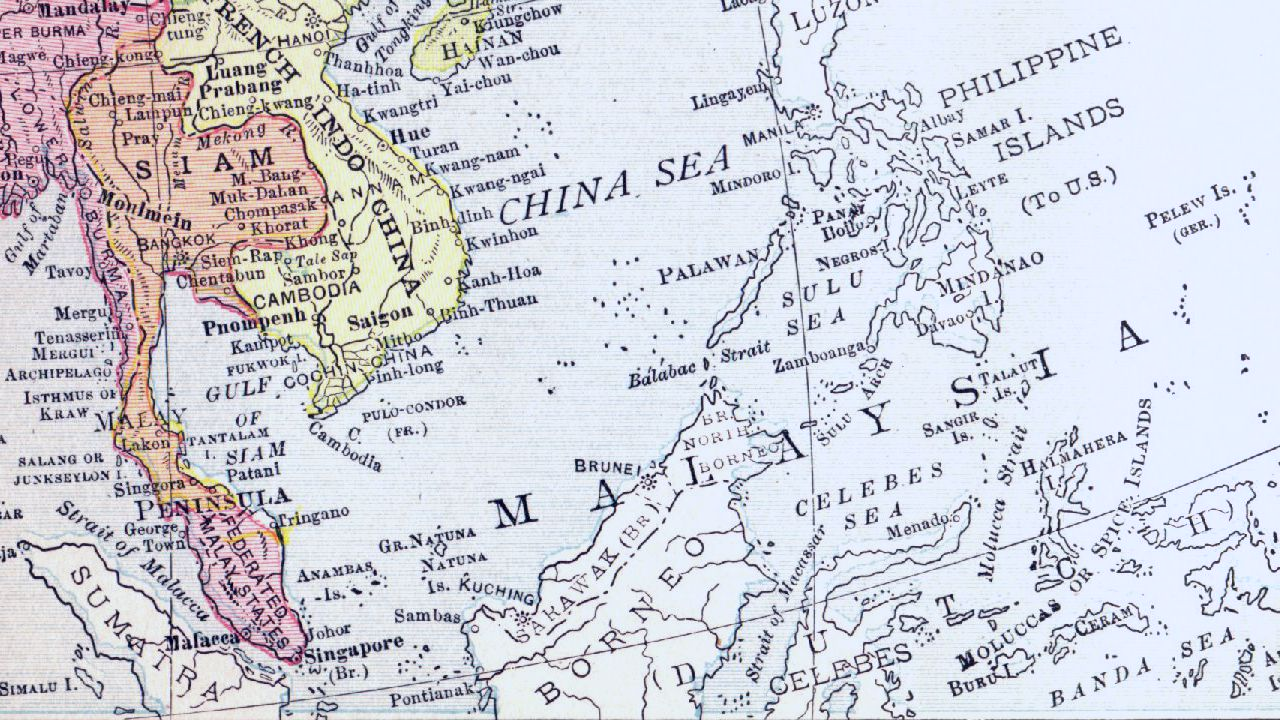
"Malaysia" used as a label for the Malay Archipelago on a 1914 map from a U.S. atlas

"Land of the Malays": a combination of Malay and the Latin/Greek suffix -sia/-σία. malayadvīpa (Sanskrit: मलयद्वीप) was the word used by ancient Indian traders when referring to the Malay Peninsula. In modern terminology, "Malay" is the name of an ethnoreligious group of Austronesian people predominantly inhabiting the Malay Peninsula and portions of adjacent islands of Southeast Asia, including the east coast of Sumatra, the coast of Borneo, and smaller islands that lie between these areas. A theory suggests that the word Melayu ('Malay') is derived from the Malay/Javanese terms melayu or mlayu (to steadily accelerate or to run), to describe the strong current of a river in Sumatra that today bore the name Sungai Melayu. The name was later possibly adopted by the Melayu Kingdom that existed in the 7th century on Sumatra. The continental part of the country bore the name Tanah Melayu (literally 'Malay Land') or Malaya until 1963, when Federation of Malaysia was formed together with the territories of Sabah, Sarawak and Singapore (the latter withdrew in 1965). The name change indicated the change of the country's boundaries beyond Malay Peninsula. Malaysian refers to its citizens of all races includes the native aboriginal people, while Malay refers to the Malay people, which makes up about half of the population.

=== Maldives ===
Scholars believe that the name "Maldives" derives from the Sanskrit maladvipa (मालद्वीप), meaning "garland of islands". Some sources say that the Tamil maalai (மாலை) or Malayalam mala (മാല): "mountain(s)", Tamil theevu (தீவு) and Sanskrit dvīp (द्वीप): "island", thus, "Mountain Islands".
- Dhivehi Raajje (ދިވެހިރާއްޖެ) (Maldivian name): "Kingdom of Maldivians". Dhivehi is a noun describing the Dhives people (Maldivians) and their language "Dhivehi" simultaneously.
- Maladwipa (मालद्वीप): Sanskrit for "garland (mala माला, Sanskrit pronunciation: [/maːlaː/]) of islands"; or, more likely, "small islands", from mala (मल) (Sanskrit pronunciation: [/mala/]) meaning "small".

=== Mali ===
After the ancient West African kingdom of the same name, where a large part of the modern country is. The word mali means "hippopotamus" in Malinké and Bamana.
- French Sudan (former colonial name). In French Soudan français. The term Sudan (see below) stems from the Arabic bilad as-sudan (البلاد السودان) ("land of the Blacks").

=== Malta ===
From either Greek or Phoenician. Of the two cultures, available evidence suggests that the Greeks had an earlier presence on the island, from as far back as 700 BC. The Greeks are known to have called the island Melita (Μελίτη) meaning "honey", as did the Romans; solid evidence for this is Malta's domination by the Byzantine Empire from 395 through to 870. It is still nicknamed the "land of honey". The theory for a Phoenician origin of the word is via 𐤈𐤄𐤋𐤀𐤌 Maleth meaning "a haven". The modern-day name comes from the Maltese language, through an evolution of one of the earlier names.

=== Marshall Islands ===
Named after British captain John Marshall, who first documented the existence of the islands in 1788. The family name is rendered Majeļ in Marshallese.

=== Mauritania ===
Latin for "land of the Moors" (from Greek máuros, μαύρος (black). Not to be confused with the classical Mauretania in northern Morocco, itself named after the Berber Mauri or Moor tribe.

=== Mauritius ===
Named Prins Maurits van Nassaueiland in 1598 after Maurice of Nassau (1567–1625), Stadtholder of Holland and Prince of Orange (1585–1625).

=== Mexico ===
After the Mexica. The meaning of the name is uncertain. Some take it as the old Nahuatl word for the sun. See also Mexican state name etymologies.

=== Federated States of Micronesia ===
Coined from the Greek words mikros (μικρός "small") and nesos (νῆσος "island") – "small islands".

=== Moldova ===
From the Moldova River in Romania, possibly from Gothic Mulda (𐌼ᚢ𐌻ᛞᚨ): "dust", "mud", via the Principality of Moldavia (Moldova in Romanian).
There is also a well-known Romanian legend about a young man named Dragoș Vodă who went hunting for an aurochs or a wisent, followed by a bunch of dogs. During the hunting expedition, all the dogs got tired and fell down, except for a female dog named Molda which ran to the wild animal all the time. After the wisent entered into a river, the female dog did the same thing, but unfortunately it got drowned and died in that way. Thanks to Molda, Dragoș finally killed the wisent and cut its head off, and in memory of his dog's sacrifice, he named the river and the land after MOLda – MOLdovA. That legend, which is a fictional story, explains the name of the territory and country's etymology and also explains why the symbol of Moldova is the wisent head.

=== Monaco ===
From the ancient Greek monoikos (μόνοικος) 'single-dwelling', through Latin Monoecus. Originally the name of an ancient colony founded in the 6th century B.C. by Phocian Greeks, and a by-name of the demigod Hercules worshiped there. (The association of Monaco with monks (Italian monaci) dates from the Grimaldi conquest of 1297: see coat of arms of Monaco.)

=== Mongolia ===
"Land of the Mongols" in Latin. "Mongol" ultimately from Mongolian Mongol (монгол) of uncertain etymology, given variously as the name of a mountain or river; a corruption of the Mongolian Mongkhe-tengri-gal ("Eternal Sky Fire"); or a derivation from Mugulu, the 4th-century founder of the Rouran Khaganate. First attested as the Mungu (Chinese: 蒙兀, Modern Chinese Měngwù, Middle Chinese Muwngu) branch of the Shiwei in an 8th-century Tang dynasty list of northern tribes, presumably related to the Liao-era Mungku (Chinese: 蒙古, Modern Chinese Měnggǔ, Middle Chinese MuwngkuX) tribe now known as the Khamag Mongol. The last head of the tribe was Yesügei, whose son Temüjin eventually united all the Shiwei tribes as the Mongol Empire (Yekhe Monggol Ulus).

=== Montenegro ===
"Black Mountain" in the Venetian language, for Mount Lovćen and its dark coniferous forests.

Crna Gora, the local endonym: As above, in Serbian (Црна Гора).
Doclea, a former name: "Land of the Docleatae", Latinized from the Greek name Dokleátai (Δοκλεάται) of an Illyrian tribe formed around old Podgorica following the Great Illyrian Revolt. The Romans subsequently hyper-corrected the name to Dioclea by "restoring" a supposed lost -I-.
Zeta, a former name: "[Land of the] Zeta River" (Зета), whose name probably relates to early Slavic roots related to "harvest" (Serbian: žetva) or "grain" (žito).

=== Morocco ===
from "Marrakesh", the south region's former capital, from Portuguese Marrocos. Form of the Berber name Mərrakəš (ⵎⵕⵕⴰⴽⵛ), probably from mur [n] akush (ⵎⵓⵔ ⵏ ⴰⴽⵓⵛ, "Land of God").

Al-Maghrib, a native name: Arabic for "the West" (المغرب), although note that in English use, the Maghreb typically refers to all of northwest Africa, not Morocco in particular. Also, Maghreb means "The Land of Sunset".

=== Mozambique ===
From the name of the Island of Mozambique, which in turn probably comes from the name of the sheik Mussa Ben Mbiki, the Arab ruler at the time when Vasco da Gama called at the island in 1498.

== N ==
=== Namibia ===
From the coastal Namib Desert. Namib means "area where there is nothing" in the Nama language.

South-West Africa, a former name: location on the continent. For Africa, see List of continent-name etymologies.
German Southwest Africa, a former name: As above. For Germany, see Germany above.

=== Nauru ===
Nauru's name in the Nauruan language is Naoero. The etymology is uncertain. German ethnologist Paul Hambruch speculates that Nauru was a contraction of a Nauruan phrase a-nuau-a-a-ororo, supposedly meaning "I go to the beach". Hambruch's theory is included in the Deutsches Kolonial-Lexikon of 1920, but linguist Alois Kayser later stated that this sentence was ungrammatical in Nauruan and an example of a folk etymology.

Early spellings used during the colonial period included Naura, Nauru, Nawodo and Onawero. When a German protectorate was proclaimed in 1888, Nauru was adopted as the official name in the Reichskommissar's report, subsequently becoming the standard spelling in both English and German. The island had previously been known in English as Pleasant Island. On independence in 1968, the Constitution of Nauru designated "Republic of Nauru" as the official English name. In May 2026, a constitutional amendment was passed to change the official English name to "Republic of Naoero", matching the spelling in the Nauruan language. On 26 June 2026, Nauru informed the United Nations that it had changed its official name to the Republic of Naoero.

=== Nepal ===
The name "Nepal" is derived from "Nepa" as mentioned in the historical maps of South Asia. "Nepa" literally means "those who domesticate cattle" in the Tibeto-Burman languages. The land was known by its people the Nepa or Nepar, Newar, Newa, Newal etc., who still inhabit the area i.e. the valley of Kathmandu and its surroundings. The Newa people use "Ra" and "La" or "Wa" and "Pa" interchangeably, hence the different names mentioned above.
Some say it derives from the Sanskrit word nīpālaya (Sanskrit: नीपालय), which means "abode at the foot of mountain', referring to its proximity to the Himalayas. (Compare the analogous European toponym "Piedmont".) Others suggest that it derives from the Tibetan niyampal, which means "holy land".

=== Netherlands ===
Netherlands literally means Low countries or Lowlands. Dutch neder and its English cognate nether both mean 'down(ward), below'. The English word is now uncommon, mostly replaced by lower in English. Neder or nether may simply have denoted the geographical characteristics of the land, both flat and down river. This may have applied to the singular form Nederland, or Niderland. It was a geographical description of low regions in the Germanic lands. Thus it was also used to refer specifically to the estuaries of the Scheldt, Meuse and Rhine, including the Lower Rhineland.

Holland, a former name: From the region of Holland within the Netherlands, often used by metonymy for the country as a whole. "Holland" from the Germanic holt-land ("wooded land"), although often pseudoetymologized as "hollow" or "marsh land").
Batavia, a former and poetic name: From the Latin name of the Germanic Batavii tribe.

=== New Zealand ===
After the province of Zeeland in the Netherlands, which means "sea land", referring to the large number of islands it contains. Abel Tasman referred to New Zealand as Staten Landt, but later Dutch cartographers used Nova Zeelandia, in Latin, followed by Nieuw Zeeland in Dutch, which Captain James Cook later anglicised to New Zealand.
- Aotearoa has become the most common name for the country in the indigenous Māori language, supplanting the loan-phrase Niu Tireni. Aotearoa conventionally means "land of the long white cloud".
- Nua Shealtainn in both Irish and Scottish Gaelic, meaning "New Shetland" (Sealtainn), itself from a metathesised form of Scots Shetland. Gaelic speakers seem to have folk-etymologised Zeeland when translating New Zealand's name from English.

=== Nicaragua ===
"Here Surrounded By Water", from Nahuatl Nicānāhuac, the name the Nicaraos gave to western Nicaragua. This endonym referred to the large bodies of water that surrounded the land the Nicaraos inhabited: The Pacific Ocean, lakes Nicaragua and Xolotlan, and the rivers and lagoons. It's a combination of the Nahuatl words Nican (here), and Ānāhuac, which in turn is a combination of the words atl (water) and nahuac, a locative meaning "surrounded".

=== Niger ===
In English, Niger may be pronounced /ˈnaɪdʒər/ or /niːˈʒɛər/.
Named after the Niger River, from a native term Ni Gir or "River Gir" or from Tuareg n'eghirren ("flowing water").

=== Nigeria ===
After the Niger river that flows through the western areas of the country and into the ocean and area. See Niger above.

=== North Korea ===
Self-descriptive, from its location in the northern portion of the Korean Peninsula. For the etymology of Korea, see Korea above.

=== North Macedonia ===
Self-descriptive, from its location in the northern portion of Macedonia.

Macedonia: The country name (Macedonian: Македонија/ Makedonija) is from the Greek word Μακεδονία (Makedonía), a kingdom (later, region) named after the ancient Macedonians. Their name, Μακεδόνες (Makedónes), derives ultimately from the ancient Greek adjective μακεδνός (makednós), meaning "tall, taper", which shares the same root as the noun μάκρος (mákros), meaning "length" in both ancient and modern Greek. The name is originally believed to have meant either "highlanders" or "the tall ones". The provisional term "the former Yugoslav Republic of Macedonia" was used in a number of international contexts in acknowledgment of a political dispute with Greece over the historical legitimacy of the country's use of the name. In February 2019, the country renamed itself to the Republic of North Macedonia.

=== Norway ===
From the Old Norse norðr and vegr, "northern way". Norðrvegr refers to long coastal passages from the western tip of Norway to its northernmost lands in the Arctic.

Natively called Norge in Bokmål and Noreg in Nynorsk.
Urmane, or Murmane (урмане; Му́рмане) in Old East Slavic: from the Old Norse pronunciation of the word Normans: "Northmen". (This word survives in the name of the Russian city Murmansk.)
An Iorua (Irish) seems to derive from a misinterpretation of Old Norse Norðrvegr as beginning the Irish definite article an, common to most country names in Irish. The rest of the word was then taken as the country name. (A similar process took place in the development of the English word "adder": originally "a nadder".)

== O ==
=== Oman ===
Etymology uncertain. It seems to be related to Pliny the Elder's Omana and Ptolemy's Omanon (Όμανον εμπόριον), both probably the ancient Sohar. The city or region is typically etymologized in Arabic from aamen or amoun ("settled" people, as opposed to the bedouin), although a number of eponymous founders have been proposed (Oman bin Ibrahim al-Khalil, Oman bin Siba' bin Yaghthan bin Ibrahim, Oman bin Qahtan, and the Biblical Lot) and others derive it from the name of a valley in Yemen at Ma'rib presumed to have been the origin of the city's founders, the Azd, a tribe migrating from Yemen.

== P ==
=== Pakistan ===
The name Pakistan literally means "Land of the Pure" in Urdu, Pashto and Persian. It was coined in 1933 as Pakstan by Choudhry Rahmat Ali, a Pakistan Movement activist, who published it in his pamphlet Now or Never, using it as an acronym ("thirty million Muslim brethren who live in PAKSTAN") referring to the names of the five northwestern regions of the British Indian Empire: Punjab, Afghania, Kashmir, Sindh, and Balochistan". The letter i was incorporated to ease pronunciation and form the linguistically correct and meaningful name (by functioning as an iżāfa).

=== Palau ===
From the native name Belau ("Palau"), traditionally derived from Palauan aidebelau ("indirect replies"), in reference to the island's creation story involving the destruction of the giant Chuab.

Belau, the local endonym: As above.
Los Palos, a former name: A Spanish adaptation of the above.
Pelew, a former name: From the transcription of Belau above by the British captain Henry Wilson, whose ship was wrecked off Ulong Island in 1783.

=== Palestine ===
The English word Palestine is derived from the Latin Palestina ("Roman Province of Palestine"), which is derived from the Ancient Greek Παλαιστίνη (Palaistine, "Philistia and surrounding regions"), which is in turn derived from the Hebrew פלשת (Pelesheth, "land of the Philistines")

=== Panama ===
After a former village near the modern capital, Panama City. From the Cueva language meaning "place of abundance of fish" or "place of many fish", possibly from the Caribe "abundance of butterflies", or possibly from another native term referring to the Panama tree.

=== Papua New Guinea ===
The country acquired its name in the 19th century. The word "Papua" derives from Malay papuah describing the hair styles found in Papuan cultures. "New Guinea" comes from the Spanish explorer Yñigo Ortiz de Retez, who noted the resemblance of the local people to those he had earlier seen along the Guinea coast of Africa.

=== Paraguay ===
The exact meaning of the word "Paraguay" is unknown, though it seems to derive from the river of the same name. One of the most common explanations is that it means "water of the Payagua (a native tribe)". Another meaning links the Guarani words para ("river") and guai ("crown"), meaning "crowned river". A third meaning may be para ("river"), gua ("from"), y ("water") meaning "water that comes from the river", referring to the bog in the north of the country, which is actually in Brazil.

=== Peru ===
The exact meaning behind the word "Peru" is obscure. The most popular theory derives it from the native word biru, meaning "river". Another explanation claims that it comes from the name of the Indigenous chieftain Pelu. Spanish explorers asked him the name of the land, but not understanding their language, he assumed they wanted his own name, which he gave them. Another possible origin is Beru, presumptively an old native name of the region.

=== Philippines ===
"Lands of Prince Philip of Asturias", from the Spanish Felipinas, honoring the future King Philip II of Spain, bestowed on the islands of Leyte and Samar by the explorer Ruy López de Villalobos in 1543 and later extended to refer to the entire archipelago. Philip's name itself is Greek (Φίλιππος, Phílippos) and means "lover of horses".

Ma-i, a former name: From the Mandarin pronunciation Máyì of the Chinese characters 麻逸 used by Cantonese traders to spell Ma-yat and Zaytonese traders to spell Ma-it, sinicizations of a local prehistoric state (probably on Mindoro or Laguna) recorded by the Sultanate of Brunei as Maidh.
St. Lazarus Islands, a former name: from the Spanish name Las islas de San Lázaro bestowed by Ferdinand Magellan in 1521 upon reaching Homonhon on the feast of St. Lazarus of Bethany.
Islands of the West, a former name: from the Spanish name Las islas de Poniente, adopted in order to assert their ownership by Spain under the terms of the Treaty of Tordesillas; the Portuguese, who (correctly, as it happens) felt the islands fell within their sphere, instead called them Ilhas do oriente ("Islands of the East"). As the problem of longitude had not been solved, and as the islands had no spice to attract conflict, López de Legazpi successfully colonized the islands for Philip II in 1565.
Katagalugan, an alternate name: "Land of the river dwellers", used by the Katipunan, originally in reference to the Tagalog-speaking areas only.

=== Poland ===
"Land of Polans", the territory of the tribe of Polans (Polanie). When the Polans formed a united Poland in the 10th century, this name also came into use for the whole Polish country. The name "Poland" (Polska) expressed both meanings until, in the 13th/14th century, the original territory of the Polans became known as Greater Poland (Wielkopolska) instead. The name of the tribe comes probably from Polish pole: "field" or "open field".

Lengyelország (Hungarian), Lenkija (Lithuanian), لهستان Lahestân (Persian) all derive from the Old Ruthenian or Old Polish ethnonym lęděnin (possibly "man ploughing virgin soil", "pioneer") and its augmentative lęch.

=== Portugal ===
From medieval Romance Portucale, from Latin Portus Cale (modern Porto and Gaia). Portus is the Latin for "port", but the meaning of Cale is debated. Some derive it from the Greek kallis (καλλἰς, "beautiful") or the Latin calēre ("to heat"). It likely was related to the Gallaeci, a Celtic people who lived nearby north of the Douro River in pre-Roman times. The etymology of their name is also unknown, but may have been related to the divine hag Cailleach.
- Lusitania (ancient predecessor and literary variant): after the Lusitanians, probably of Celtic origin, as Lus and Tanus, "tribe of Lusus".

== Q ==
=== Qatar ===
Derives from Qatara, believed to refer to the Qatari town of Zubarah, an important trading port and town in the region in ancient times. The word "Qatara" first appeared on Ptolemy's map of the Arab world. In the early 20th century, English speakers often pronounced Qatar as "Cutter", close to the local pronunciation in Qatar. However, the traditional English pronunciation ("Kuh-tahr") has prevailed.

== R ==
=== Romania ===
"Roman Realm". The Roman Empire conquered a large part of the country, and the inhabitants became Romanized (Romanians). Older variants of the name include Rumania and (in a French-influenced spelling) Roumania. The term român (the ethnic group of Romanians) comes from the Latin term romanus, which means Roman, so the name Romania was adopted to accentuate the Latin origin of Romanian people and language. The term was first used during the leadership of Carol I, whose 1866 constitution declared Romania the country's official name.
- Dacia, older name and Latin variant: named after the ancient people the Dacians.
- Wallachia, Slavic and Germanic name for the country, from the Gothic word for Celts: walh. Later also used for the Romanized tribes. This Germanic form derives from the name of the Celtic tribe of Volcae. Compare with the etymologies of Wales and Wallonia.

=== Russia ===
English and Russian: from Rosia or Rossiya, from the Byzantine Greek Rōsía (Ρωσία), meaning "Land of the Rōs" (Ρως). Generally agreed to be from a Varangian group known as the Rus', named after the Roslagen region in Sweden, ultimately from Old Norse rods-, "row" or "rower". Within Russia, Soviet scholarship depreciated Kievan Rus's Scandinavian origin in favor of Slavic ones, offering a variety of other pseudoetymologies. See also Sweden below.
- Latvian: Krievija, named after the ancient Krivichs tribe, related to the modern Belarusians.
- Vene or Venemaa (Estonian) and Venäjä (Finnish): after the ancient Venedes.

=== Rwanda ===
"Large or big", from the Kinyarwanda kwanda ("expand"), as eventually applied to the Tutsi Nyiginya mwamis descended from Ruganzu Ndori or the speakers of Kinyarwanda. Rwanda means a big country. Historically Rwanda expanded from Gasabo (a tiny locality near Lake Muhazi) to the entire territory as it was known before the Berlin conference. Rwanda's zone of influence expanded to southern parts of Uganda, western parts of Tanzania and eastern part of the Democratic Republic of Congo (DRC).

== S ==
=== Sahrawi Arab Democratic Republic ===
After the Sahrawi people. Their territory is disputed with Morocco, who claim the region as their Western Sahara territory.

Western Sahara, the name of the territory it claims: After its geographic position. "Sahara" derives from the Arabic aṣ-Ṣaḥrā' (الصحراء), meaning "desert".
Spanish Sahara, a former name: from its previous occupation by Spain.

=== Saint Kitts and Nevis ===
St. Kitts took its name in honour of Saint Christopher, the patron saint of travelling. Christopher Columbus probably named the island for Saint Christopher, though this remains uncertain. British sailors later shortened the name to St. Kitts.
Nevis derives from the Spanish phrase Nuestra Señora de las Nieves, which means "Our Lady of the Snows", after the permanent halo of white clouds that surrounded mountains on the island.

=== Saint Lucia ===
"Saint Lucy" in Latin, for the shipwreck upon the island of French sailors on St. Lucy's Day, 13 December 1502.

=== Saint Vincent and the Grenadines ===
Saint Vincent: bestowed by Christopher Columbus for their discovery on St. Vincent's Day, 22 January 1498.
The Grenadines: From the Spanish city of Granada. (See Grenada)

=== Samoa ===
"Holy Center", from a compound of the Samoan sa ("sacred") and moa ("center").
The name is alternatively derived from a local chieftain named Samoa or an indigenous word meaning "place of the moa", a now-extinct bird.

=== San Marino ===
"Saint Marinus" in Italian, for the (possibly legendary) stonemason who fled to the area's Mount Titano around AD 301 or 305 from his home on the island of Arbe in modern-day Croatia to order to escape Roman persecution.

=== São Tomé and Príncipe ===
São Tomé: "Saint Thomas" in Portuguese, for its discovery on St. Thomas Day, 21 December 1470 or 1471.
Príncipe: "Prince" in Portuguese, from shortening its original name Ilha do Principe ("Isle of the Prince") in reference to the Prince of Portugal to whom duties on the island's sugar crop were paid.

=== Saudi Arabia ===
Named after House of Saud, the ruling dynasty of the country. The dynasty itself took its name from its patriarch Saud (Arabic: Sa`ûd), whose name means "Happiness". Arabia itself from the Latin name, of uncertain though probably Semitic etymology, although as early as Ancient Egypt the region was known as Ar Rabi.

=== Kingdom of Scotland ===
"Land of the Scots", from the Latin "Scoti" as recorded by the Romans to refer to the Gaels of then Ireland and western Scotland, the later of which were later conquered by but then assimilated the Picts to form the medieval Kingdom. The use of Scot- to refer to Gaels of Ireland gradually stopped.

Alba in Scottish Gaelic, and is probably of Pictish origin, being a cognate with Albion, the old Celtic name for Britain.

=== Senegal ===
From the Senegal river. After a Portuguese variant of the name of the Berber Zenaga (Arabic Senhaja) tribe, which dominated much of the area to the north of modern Senegal, i.e. present-day Mauritania.

=== Serbia ===
The exact origin of the name is uncertain (see Names of the Serbs and Serbia). The name of the Sorbs in present-day Germany has the same origin.

=== Serbia and Montenegro ===
Self-descriptive, from its two constituent states. For the etymology of each, see Montenegro and Serbia above.

=== Seychelles ===
Named after Jean Moreau de Séchelles, Finance Minister to King Louis XV of France from 1754 to 1756.

=== Sierra Leone ===
"Lion Mountains". (Terra Leone) Adapted from Sierra Leona, the Spanish version of the Portuguese Serra Leoa. The Portuguese explorer Pedro de Sintra named the country after the striking mountains that he saw in 1462 while sailing the West African coast. It remains unclear what exactly made the mountains look like lions. Three main explanations exist: that the mountains resembled the teeth of a lion, that they looked like sleeping lions, or that thunder which broke out around the mountains sounded like a lion's roar.

=== Singapore ===
"Lion City", from Singapura (in Malay) derives from Sanskrit word simhapura (Sanskrit: सिंहपुर). Singapore is the anglicized form of the Malay name, which is still in use today, along with variants in Chinese and Tamil. The lion, or what became the legendary Merlion, usually depicts Sang Nila Utama's discovery of the island Temasek, from Malay or Javanese root tasik, meaning lake.

=== Slovakia ===
From the Slavic "Slavs". The origin of the word Slav itself remains uncertain.

=== Slovenia ===
"Land of the Slavs" in Slovene and other South Slavic languages. The etymology of Slav itself remains uncertain. Some etymologists believe that the part -ven refers to the ancient Germanic tribes of the Venetii who supposedly also gave their name to the city of Venice.

=== Solomon Islands ===
Named for the Biblical King Solomon by the Spanish explorer Alvaro de Mendaña y Neyra in 1567 or 1568. The name was bestowed after the legendary wealth of King Solomon's mines, which Mendaña y Neyra hoped to find.

=== Somalia ===
"Land of the Somali". Somali itself is of uncertain etymology, although some have proposed a derivation from sac maal ("cattle herders") or a legendary patriarch named Samaale.

=== South Africa ===
Self-descriptive, from its location in Africa. For the etymology of Africa, see list of continent-name etymologies.

Suid-Afrika, a local endonym: "South Africa" in Afrikaans
Azania (alternative name): some opponents of the white-minority rule of the country used the name Azania in place of "South Africa" . The origin of this name remains uncertain, but the name has referred to various parts of sub-Saharan East-Africa. Recently, two suggestions for the origin of the word have emerged. The first cites the Arabic 'ajam ("foreigner, non-Arab"). The second references the Greek verb azainein ("to dry, parch"), which fits the identification of Azania with arid sub-Saharan Africa.
Mzansi, an alternative endonym: a popular, widespread nickname among locals, used often in parlance but never officially adopted. (uMzantsi in isiXhosa means "south".)

=== South Korea ===
Self-descriptive, from its location in the southern portion of the Korean Peninsula. For the etymology of Korea, see Korea above.

=== South Sudan ===
Self-descriptive, from its former position within Sudan before independence in 2011. For the etymology of Sudan, see Sudan below.

=== Spain ===
"Island of Hyraxes", from Norman French Spagne, from the Latin Hispania, from the Punic ʾÎ-šəpānîm (אי שפנים), probably from mistaking rabbits for the African hyrax. Others have proposed that it may derive from the terms "iz", meaning sea, and "bania" or "pania", meaning divide, giving the meaning "the land that divides the Sea", or, simply, "the land".

=== Sri Lanka ===
"Holy Island", from Sanskrit Sri (श्री, "holy", "resplendent") and Lanka (लंका, "island"). "Lanka" was also the name of the capital of King Ravana in the sanskrit epic Ramayana.

Ceylon, a former name: From Ceilão (Portuguese), Seilan (former names), from the Pali शिन्हल Sinhalana meaning "land of the lions".
Helanka, its name in Sinhala: "Lanka of Hela's", "Heladiva" (Sinhala) meaning the "Island of Hela's", since original natives of the island was called "Hela".
Serendip, a former name: derived from the sihalan-dip, meaning "the island of sihala's or originally "Hela's" Or from "swaran-dip", meaning "golden island".
Taproben, a former name: changed from dip-Raawan, meaning "the island of King Rawana"

=== Sudan ===
"Land of the Black people", from the Arabic bilad as-sudan (بلاد السودان), which originally referred to most of the Sahel region.

=== Suriname ===
After the Surinen people, the earliest known native American inhabitants of the region.

=== Sweden ===
"Swedes", an old English plural form of Swede. From the Old English Sweoðeod, the Old Norse Sviþjoð. The etymology of the first element, Svi, links to the PIE *suos ("one's own", "of one's own kin"). The last element, þjoð, means "people", cognate with deut in Deutsch and teut in Teutons.

Sverige, a local endonym: "Swedish Realm" (modern Swedish: Svea Rike).
Rootsi (Estonian) and Ruotsi (Finnish): named after the Roslagen region in Sweden, ultimately from Old Norse rods-, "row" or "rower". See also Russia above.

=== Switzerland ===
From the toponym Schwyz first attested AD 972 as Suittes, derived from an Alemannic proper name Suito.

Helvetia, a former and poetic name: From the Latin, after a Celtic people known to the Romans as the Helvetii.

=== Syria ===
Meaning unknown. From the Ancient Greek Syria (Συρία). Probably related to syriac. Syriac people descend from big old "Syria" which involved modern Syria, Lebanon, south of modern Turkey and north of current Iraq.
Not to be confused with Assyria (Assyrians: Arabic: "ashouriyin" آشوريين / Syriac: Arabic: "sourian" سريان
Not to be confused with Syrians: Arabic "souriyin" سوريين which stands for the people of current Syria

== T ==
=== Taiwan ===
Tayowan was the name of a coastal sandbank (now Anping in the city of Tainan) where the Dutch East India Company built Fort Zeelandia, the headquarters of their colony on the island. The name may have originally referred to an aboriginal tribe in the area. The present Chinese name (臺灣, pinyin: Táiwān) conveys the meaning "Terraced Bay", but older versions such as 臺員 have entirely different meanings and suggest that the Chinese is merely a transcription of the older name.

Formosa ("beautiful" in Portuguese), a poetic and former name.

=== Tajikistan ===
"Home of the Tajiks", a Persian-speaking ethnic group, with the suffix -stan. Sogdian Tājīk (j pronounced /ʒ/) was the local pronunciation of New Persian Tāzī, from Sassanian Persian Tāzīg, derived from the Tayy tribe and meaning "Arab". The Tajiks were New Persian–speaking Muslims, although not necessarily Arabs. (An alternate etymology is via Tibetan Tag Dzig, meaning "Persian" and "tiger" or "leopard".)

=== Tanzania ===
"Land of Tanganyika and Zanzibar", a blend and simplification of the original name – "United Republic of Tanganyika and Zanzibar" – assumed upon independence in 1964

Tanganyika was named for its lake, of uncertain etymology. Sir Richard Francis Burton derived it from the local tou tanganyka, "to join" in the sense "where waters meet." Henry Stanley derived it from tonga ("island") and hika ("flat").
Zanzibar was an Arabic name meaning "Black Coast" (Arabic: زنجبار, Zanjibār, from Persian: زنگبار, Zangibar)

=== Thailand ===
"Land of the Thai" (Thai: ไทย), an ethnic group from the central plains (see Tai peoples). The name Tai itself (ไท) is of uncertain etymology, although it has been argued to have originally meant "people" or "human being" since some rural areas use the word in this way as opposed to the normal Thai word khon (คน). A more common pseudoetymology derives the demonym from the word thai (ไท) meaning "freedom".

Ratcha Anachak Thai (ราชอาณาจักรไทย), endonym, meaning "Royal Domain of Thailand"
Siam (สยาม, Sayam), a former name, of uncertain etymology. One theory holds it derives from the Pāli toponym Suvarnabhumi (शुभर्नभुमि, "Land of Gold"). Another traces it – along with the Shan and A-hom – from Sanskrit Śyâma (श्याम, "dark").

=== Togo ===
"By the water" or "behind the sea", derived from Ewe to ("water") and go ("shore"). Originally it just referred to the town of Togo (now Togoville), later the Germans extended the name to the whole nation.

=== Tonga ===
"South" or "Southern" in Samoan, in reference to their position relative to Samoa.
- Friendly Islands, a former name, bestowed by British Captain James Cook in 1773 after the friendliness and hospitality of the people he met on the islands.

=== Trinidad and Tobago ===
Trinidad, from Spanish La Isla de la Trinidad ("Island of the Holy Trinity"). The name was bestowed by Christopher Columbus to fulfill a vow he had made before setting out on his third voyage.
Tobago, of uncertain etymology, but probably from the tobacco grown and smoked by the natives.

Iere, the former Arawak name for Trinidad according to historian E.L. Joseph, who derived it from ierèttê or yerettê, meaning "hummingbird". Others have claimed the Arawak word for hummingbird was tukusi or tucuchi and that iere or kairi simply means "island".

=== Tunisia ===
"Land of Tunis", its capital. Tunis's name possibly derives from the Phoenician goddess Tanith, the ancient city of Tynes, or the Berber ens, meaning "to lie down" or "to rest".

=== Turkey ===
"Land of the Turks", Latin Turcia and Arabic Turkiyye, an ethnic group whose name derives from their endonym Türk ("created"). Some historical use:

- The Greek cognate of this name, Tourkia (Greek: Τουρκία) was used by the Byzantine emperor and scholar Constantine VII Porphyrogenitus in his book De Administrando Imperio; though in his use, "Turks" always referred to Magyars.
- The Ottoman Empire was sometimes referred to as Turkey or the Turkish Empire among its contemporaries.
- The medieval Khazar Empire, a Turkic state on the northern shores of the Black and Caspian seas, was referred to as Tourkia ("land of the Turks") in Byzantine sources.
- Mamluk Sultanate is known in local language as "Sulṭanat Misr al-Mamālīk Dawla al-Turkiyya"

=== Turkmenistan ===
"Home (stān) of the Turkmens", an ethnic group whose name derives from the Sogdian Türkmen ("Turk-like"), in reference to their status outside the Turkic dynastic mythological system. However, modern scholars sometimes prefer to see the suffix as an intensifier, changing the meaning to "pure Turk" or "most Turk-like of the Turks". Muslim chroniclers such as Ibn-Kathir advocated a pseudoetymology from Türk and iman (Arabic: إيمان, "faith, belief") in reference to a mass conversion of two hundred thousand households in 971 (AH 349).

=== Tuvalu ===
"Eight Islands" or "eight standing with each other" in Tuvaluan. (Tuvalu consists of nine islands, but only eight of them were traditionally inhabited before Niulakita was settled in 1949.)

Ellice Islands, a former name, in honor of Edward Ellice, Sr., a British politician and merchant, who owned the cargo of the ship Rebecca which sighted the islands in 1819. The name was abandoned for the endonym Tuvalu upon separation from the Gilbert Islands (modern Kiribati) in 1975.

== U ==
=== Uganda ===
Uganda is named after the Buganda Kingdom which occupies the central region of the country. The word "Buganda" is derived from "muganda" which means "a bundle" or "united as in a bundle" in the Buganda language. The "Bu-" prefix in Buganda means "land" pronounced with a soft "b" sound. In Swahili it became "Uganda" as Swahili does not have a soft "b" sound. The final pronunciation of Uganda is the English pronunciation. So "Uganda" actually means "land of the united peoples".

=== Ukraine ===
"Edge, borderland" from the Slavic kraj or okraina
"Land, country" from the Slavic kraj or krajna

=== Union of Soviet Socialist Republics ===
Translated from the Russian Soyuz Sovietskikh Sotsialisticheskikh Respublik (Сою́з Сове́тских Социалисти́ческих Респу́блик) adopted in December 1922 during the merger of the Russian Soviet Federative Socialist Republic, Transcaucasian Socialist Federative Soviet Republic, Ukrainian Soviet Socialist Republic and Byelorussian Soviet Socialist Republic.
The word Soviet (совет, "council" or "board") referred to the Communist planning committees, it is used in English untranslated.

Soviet Union, an alternate name: A shortened form of the above (Советский Союз, Sovietsky Soyuz).

=== United Arab Emirates ===
Self-descriptive, from the Arabic. For Arabia, see Saudi Arabia above. "Emirate" from "emir", Arabic.

Trucial Oman & Trucial States, former names: From Oman above and a 19th-century truce between the United Kingdom and the local sheikhs.

=== United Kingdom ===
Self-descriptive; short-form name of "United Kingdom of Great Britain and Northern Ireland", in reference to the island of Great Britain and the country of Northern Ireland. Adopted in 1927 from the realm's previous name, the United Kingdom of Great Britain and Ireland, following the 1922 creation of the Irish Free State (present-day Ireland).

Albion, a previous and poetic name: From a Greek adaptation (Ἀλβίων) of a pre-Roman Celtic name for the island (See also "Alba"). The name may refer to the white cliffs of Dover.
Britain, an alternate name: From Latin Britannia, probably via French or Welsh (Prydain), from Pretani ("painted ones"), probably in reference to the use of woad body-paint and tattoos by early inhabitants of the islands, although it may derive from the Celtic goddess Brigid. A traditional pseudoetymology mentioned by Geoffrey of Monmouth traced the name to the Trojan exile Brutus.
Great Britain, an alternate name: "Larger Britain", from Mediaeval Latin Britannia Maior, first recorded by Geoffrey of Monmouth, who employed it to distinguish the island from Britannia Minor ("Little Britain"), or Brittany in modern France. In classical times, the Graeco-Roman geographer Ptolemy in his Almagest also called the island megale Brettania (great Britain), contrasting it at that time to the smaller island of Ireland, which he called mikra Brettania (little Britain).
Kingdom of Great Britain, a former name: Self-descriptive, employed following the union of the English and Scottish crowns (1707) and prior to the union with Ireland (1801).
United Kingdom, an alternate name: a shortened form of the realm's official names above and below, although note that "united kingdom" was used as a description but not the name of the kingdom formed by legally joining the Kingdoms of England and Scotland previously held in personal union by the House of Stuart.
United Kingdom of Great Britain and Ireland, a previous name: Adopted in 1801 from the previous names of the two kingdoms, Great Britain and Ireland, following British and Irish legislation converting the personal union of the British and Irish crowns into a single sovereign state. The name was emended to its present form in 1927, five years after the creation of the Irish Free State (present-day Ireland).

=== United States ===
Self-descriptive, although note that – similar to the original "united Kingdom of Great Britain" above – the U.S. Declaration of Independence described the new nation as the (lower-case) "united States of America". The adjective had become a part of the name by the time of the adoption of the United States Constitution, however, whose preamble describes the "United States". Similarly, the grammatical number of the name has changed over time: common usage before the American Civil War was to reference "these United States" whereas modern usage has "the United States".

United States of America, the full name: As above. For the etymology of America, see list of continent name etymologies.

=== Uruguay ===
"Land beside the Uruguay River", a shortened form of the Spanish Republica Oriental del Uruguay ("Eastern Republic of Uruguay"). The word Uruguay itself derives from Guaraní, although the precise meaning is unknown. Some derive it from urugua ("shellfish") and i ("water"), others from uru (a kind of bird in the region), gua ("proceed from"), and i.

=== Uzbekistan ===
"Home of the Free", from an amalgamation of uz (Turkic: "self"), bek (Turkic: "master", "bey in modern Turkish"), and -stan (Persian: "land of").

== V ==
=== Vanuatu ===
Vanuatu's name was adopted upon independence in July 1980, replacing the name New Hebrides previously used for the archipelago. Vanuatu is derived from the word vanua, which means "land" or "home" in several Austronesian languages, and the word tu, meaning "to stand" or "remain". According to the country's first prime minister Walter Lini, the name was intended to connote "a country that has stood alone and will continue to stand alone".

There was historically no indigenous name for the archipelago as a whole. The name New Hebrides was given by British explorer James Cook in 1774 in honour of the Hebrides archipelago of Scotland; on the same voyage he named New Caledonia after the Latin name for Scotland. A few years earlier French explorer Louis Antoine de Bougainville had named the islands Archipel des grandes Cyclades ("Archipelago of the Great Cyclades"), but this name was replaced in French by Nouvelles-Hébrides, a translation of Cook's name.

The first locally coined name for the New Hebrides was Vanuaaku (also spelled Vanua'aku or Vanua-Aku). This name was adopted in 1977 by the pro-independence New Hebrides National Party, which simultaneously renamed itself the Vanua'aku Pati (VP), and was translated as "my land" or "our land" deriving from vanua and the pronoun aku. It was used in the proclamation of independence made by the Vanuaaku People's Provisional Government in 1978. In February 1980, the New Hebrides Representative Assembly formally voted by 26 votes to 2 to adopt Vanuatu as the country's name on independence. The modified name was put forward by a subcommittee on national symbols, which felt that Vanuaaku was too closely associated with the VP, and has been credited to Tom Tipolomata of Tongoa.

=== Vatican City ===
"City on Vatican Hill", translated from the Italian Città del Vaticano and Latin Civitas Vaticana, from the site of the territory remaining to the state after the mid-19th-century Unification of Italy and upon its 1929 reestablishment. The name of the hill itself came from the Latin Mons Vaticanus, from the name of the surrounding lands ager vaticanus, from the verb vaticinari ("to prophesy"), in reference to the fortune-tellers and soothsayers who used the streets in the area during Roman times.

Papal States, a former name: loosely translated from the Italian Stati Pontifici and Latin Status Pontificius ("Pontifical States"). The name is usually plural both to denote its various holdings – the former Duchies of Rome and Pontecorvo, the former Principality of Benevento, the March of Ancona, Bologna, Romagna, and the Campagne and Maritime Province continued to be administered separately despite forming a unified state – and to distinguish this realm from the current country. "Papal" from Latin papa ("father"), borrowed by the Bishop of Rome from the Pope of Alexandria to denote his leadership over the church. "State" distinguished this realm and its administration from the church and papacy's lands in other realms and from the administration of the church itself.
Pontifical States, a former name: a less common but more precise variation of the above. The title "pontiff", from Latin pontifex, was carried over from the Romans' pontifex maximus, a high priest whose name is generally understood to mean "bridge-maker" (pons + -fex, "builder", "maker", from facio, "build", "make").
States of the Church, a former name: translated from the Italian Stati della Chiesa. The name was plural to denote the various holdings united under the Papacy and distinguish it from the modern state. Chiesa derives from the Latin ecclesia, from the Ancient Greek ékklēsía (έκκλησία, "church", originally "assembly"), from ekklētos ("called out") from ekkalein (ἐκκαλεῖν, a compound of ek-, "out", and kalein, "call").

=== Venezuela ===
"Little Venice", from Italian Venezuola, the diminutive of Venezia (Italian: "Venice"), for the native stilt-houses built on Lake Maracaibo which reminded the explorers Alonso de Ojeda and Amerigo Vespucci of buildings in Venice.

=== Vietnam ===
"Viet South" (Vietnamese: Việt Nam), an inversion of Nam Việt (南越), the name of the 2nd-century BC kingdom. The qualifier nam (south) was added to distinguish this kingdom from other Viet, or Yue, kingdoms, such as Minyue. The word "Viet" is a shortened form of Bách Việt (Chinese: 百越; pinyin: Bǎiyuè), which in early usage applied to a people in Guangdong. Ancient historian Sima Qian wrote that Wu Qi of Chu went "south to suppress the Bai Yue" in 368 B.C. The first recorded usage is in the Chinese encyclopedia Lüshi Chunqiu, compiled around 239 B.C. After Vietnam gained independence in 938, several variations on the word Viet, including "Nam Viet" and "Dai Viet" (Great Viet), were used officially. The name "Vietnam" is first recorded in a 16th-century poem by Nguyen Binh Khiem. In the 19th and early 20th centuries, the country was usually referred to as Annam ("Pacified South", 南). "Vietnam" was revived by Phan Bội Châu's book Việt Nam vong quốc sử (History of the Loss of Vietnam), published in 1905, and later by the Viet Quoc, a nationalist party which organized the Yen Bai mutiny against the French colonial authorities in 1930. In 1945, the name was adopted officially by both Bao Dai's imperial government in Hue and by Ho Chi Minh's Viet Minh government in Hanoi.

== Y ==
=== Yemen ===
Uncertain etymology, most probably from Arabic ymn (يمن). Some claim it comes from yamīn (يَمين, "right-hand side" in the sense of "south"). Others that it comes from the form yumn (يُمْن, "happiness") and is related to the region's classical name Arabia Felix.

=== Yugoslavia ===
"Land of the South Slavs" in Serbo-Croatian and Slovene, Jugoslavija, in reference to the Slavic peoples south of Hungary and Romania.

== Z ==
=== Zambia ===
"Land of the Zambezi", which flows through the east of the country and also forms its border with Zimbabwe.

Northern Rhodesia, a former name: From the division of Rhodesia, Neo-Latin for "Land of Rhodes", the British South African minister and businessman who helped found the colony through his involvement with the British South Africa Company.

=== Zimbabwe ===
"House of Stones", Dzimba-dze-mabwe in Shona, in reference to Great Zimbabwe.

Rhodesia and Southern Rhodesia, former names: see Zambia above. The country was also briefly known as Zimbabwe Rhodesia between 1979 and 1980.

== See also ==
- List of ISO 3166 country codes
- List of etymologies of administrative divisions
- List of continent name etymologies
- List of places named after people
- List of countries named after people
- Lists of etymologies
- List of double placenames
- Toponymy
- Etymology
