= List of continent name etymologies =

This is a list of the etymologies of continent names as they are currently found on Earth.

== Africa ==
The name Africa was originally used by the ancient Romans to refer to the northern part of the continent that corresponds to modern-day Tunisia. There are many theories regarding its origin.

- Africa terra means "land of the Afri" (plural, or "Afer" singular), referring to the Afri tribe, who dwelt in Northern Africa around the area of Carthage. Their name might come from Phoenician afar "dust”.
- Berber: The early inhabitantes of the mountains of the Jebel Yefren or "Jebel Ifren" (close to current Tripoli) were known as the Ifren. This derives from the Berber word "ifri", meaning "a cave". The word "effer" means to hide. Cave dwelling tribes were the most common due to their abundance in the region, the shelter they provide from heat and cold and their natural protection against attackers or predators. "Africa" initially described the majority of the cave dwelling people of the "ifer" in North Africa.
- Greek aphrike (*ἀφρίκη) "without cold". This was proposed by historian Leo Africanus (1488–1554), who suggested the Greek word phrike (φρίκη, meaning "cold and horror"), combined with the negating prefix "a-", thus indicating a land free of cold and horror. However, as the change of sound from ph to f in Greek is datable to about the 10th century, it is unlikely this is the origin.
- Latin aprica "sunny".
- Another suggestion is that the name comes from the Ancient Egyptian word afruika - which means 'turning towards the ka' or 'turning towards the birthplace' or 'motherland' of humanity.

The name "Africa" began to be stretched to encompass a larger area when the provinces of Tripolitania, Numidia and Mauretania Caesariensis were subdued to the Diocesis of Africa, following the administrative restructuring of Diocletian. Later, when Justinian I reconquered lands of the former West Roman Empire, all the regions from the Chelif River to the Gulf of Sidra were annexed to the Byzantine Empire as the "Exarchate of Africa".

During the Middle Ages, as the Europeans increased their knowledge and awareness of the size of the African continent, they progressively extended the name of Africa to the rest of the continent.

== America ==
The continent of America is thought to be named after the Italian explorer Amerigo Vespucci (who styled himself Americus Vespucius in Latin). Amerigo Vespucci was named after Saint Emeric of Hungary, who was in turn named for his maternal uncle, the Holy Roman Emperor Henry II. Vespucci, following his four voyages exploring the coastlines of Venezuela and Brazil, first developed the idea that the newly discovered western land was in fact a continent. The German cartographer Martin Waldseemüller created the earliest known map showing the name America, which he applied to the South American continent only.

1594 world map by Petrus Plancius

The 1594 map by Petrus Plancius labels the two landmasses "America Mexicana" and "America Peruana", two terms still used in the 17th century.

In the late 19th century, it was theorized that the name could have been patterned on the Mayan language for the Amerrisque Mountains in present-day Nicaragua.

An alternative theory was proposed by the local Bristol antiquarian Alfred Hudd who proposed that the word America had evolved from Amerike or ap Meryk, based on a lost manuscript which he claimed to have seen. Alfred Hudd was an aristocrat who belonged to the Clifton Antiquarian Club of Bristol, founded in 1884 to arrange meetings and excursions for the study of objects of archaeological interest in the West of England and South Wales. He also collected butterflies, was a naturalist and member of the Bristol Naturalists' Society. Hudd proposed that the word "America" was originally applied to a destination across the western ocean, possibly an island or a fishing station in Newfoundland. After the king of Denmark and ruler of Iceland had cut off trade for fish, England sent out expeditions to find new sources. Hudd suggested Amerike's sponsorship made his name known in Bristol in association with the North American destinations prior to other mapmaking or voyages. The writer Jonathan Cohen noted he made a conjectural leap to reach that conclusion, and no extant evidence supports it. In the 21st century, the scholar John Davies briefly mentioned the story as a kind of Welsh patriot piece.

== Antarctica ==
The word Antarctica comes from Greek antarktikos (ἀνταρκτικός), from anti (ἀντί) and arktikos (ἀρκτικός) "Arctic". Literally "opposite to the Arctic (opposite to the North)". Arktikos comes from Arktos, the Greek name for the constellation of the Great Bear Ursa Major, visible only in the Northern Hemisphere, which comes from the ancient Greek word ἄρκτος (Greek: [ˈarktos]), which means "bear".

== Asia ==
The word Asia originated from the Ancient Greek word Ἀσία, first attributed to Herodotus (about 440 BCE) in reference to Anatolia or to the Persian Empire, in contrast to Greece and Egypt.

It originally was just a name for the east bank of the Aegean Sea, an area known to the Hittites as Assuwa. In early Classical times, the Greeks started using the term "Asia" to refer to the whole region known today as Anatolia (the peninsula which forms the Asian portion of present-day Turkey). The Roman Empire referred to the entire Lydian region of what is now northwestern Turkey as the province of Asia. Eventually, however, the name had been stretched progressively further east, until it came to encompass the much larger land area with which the name is associated today, while the Anatolian Peninsula started being called "Asia Minor" or "The Lesser Asia" instead.

The deeper root of the etymology can only be guessed at. The following two possibilities have been suggested:

- It could have originated from the Aegean root Asis which means "muddy and silty" as a description of the eastern shores of the Aegean Sea.
- It could derive from the borrowed Semitic root Asu, which means varyingly "rising" or "light", of course a directional referring to the sunrise, Asia thus meaning 'Eastern Land'.

However, since the Greek name Asia is in all likelihood related to Hittite Assuwa, the etymology of one has to account for the other as well.

It is personified in Greek mythology by the deity of the same name.

== Australia ==
The word Australia means "Southern Land" in Neo-Latin, adapted from the legendary pseudo-geographical Terra Australis Incognita ("Unknown Southern Land") dating back to the Roman era. First appearing as a corruption of the Spanish name for an island in Vanuatu in 1625, "Australia" was slowly popularized following the advocacy of the British explorer Matthew Flinders in his 1814 description of his circumnavigation of the island. Lachlan Macquarie, a Governor of New South Wales, used the word in his dispatches to England and recommended it be formally adopted by the Colonial Office in 1817. The Admiralty agreed seven years later and the continent became officially known as Australia in 1824.

== Europe ==
In classical Greek mythology, Europa (Ancient Greek: Εὐρώπη, Eurṓpē) was a Phoenician princess. Greek Εὐρώπη (Eurṓpē) contains the elements εὐρύς (eurus), "wide, broad" and ὤψ/ὠπ-/ὀπτ- (ōps/ ōp-/opt-) "eye, face, countenance". Broad has been an epithet of Earth herself in the reconstructed Proto-Indo-European religion.

It is common in ancient Greek mythology and geography to identify lands or rivers with female figures. Thus, Europa is first used in a geographic context in the Homeric Hymn to Delian Apollo, in reference to the western shore of the Aegean Sea. As a name for a part of the known world, it is first used in the 6th century BC by Anaximander and Hecataeus. The weakness of an etymology with εὐρύς (eurus), is 1. that the -u stem of εὐρύς disappears in Εὐρώπη Europa and 2. the expected form εὐρυώπη euryopa that retains the -u stem in fact exists.

An alternative suggestion due to Ernest Klein and Giovanni Semerano (1966) attempted to connect a Semitic term for "west", Akkadian erebu meaning "to go down, set" (in reference to the sun), Phoenician 'ereb "evening; west", which would parallel occident (the resemblance to Erebus, from PIE *h_{1}regʷos, "darkness", is accidental, however). Barry (1999) adduces the word Ereb on an Assyrian stele with the meaning of "night", "[the country of] sunset", in opposition to Asu "[the country of] sunrise", i.e. Asia (Anatolia coming equally from Ἀνατολή, "(sun)rise", "east"). This proposal is mostly considered unlikely or untenable. (Note: Martin Litchfield West states that "phonologically, the match between Europa's name and any form of the Semitic word is very poor".)

== Oceania ==
The word Oceania comes from the English word ocean for 'a large body of water'. It is ultimately derived from Greek Ὠκεανός (Okeanos), the great river or sea surrounding the disk of the Earth. In Greek mythology, it is personified as Oceanus, son of Uranus and Gaia and husband of Tethys.

== Other ==
=== Zealandia ===
Zealandia (/ziːˈlændiə/), also known as the New Zealand continent or Tasmantis, is a nearly submerged continental fragment that sank after breaking away from Australia 60–85 Ma (million years) ago, and most of it (93%) remains submerged beneath the Pacific Ocean. It derives its name from the island country of New Zealand which occupies the vast majority of its non-submerged land. Dutch explorers named the land Nova Zeelandia after the Dutch province of Zeeland, and British explorer James Cook subsequently anglicised the name to New Zealand.

=== Pangaea ===
The name Pangaea/Pangea is derived from Ancient Greek pan (πᾶν, "all, entire, whole") and Gaia (Γαῖα, "Mother Earth, land"). (Note: As "Pangaea", it appears in Greek mythology as a mountain battle site during the Titanomachia. As "Pangaeus", it was the name of a specific mountain range in southern Thrace. "Pangaea" also appears in Vergil's Georgics and Lucan's Pharsalia The scholiast on Lucan glossed Pangaea id est totum terra—"Pangaea: that is, all land"—as having received its name on account of its smooth terrain and unexpected fertility.) The word was allegedly coined by German meteorologist Alfred L. Wegener in 1915. The name was meant to imply the all-encompassing nature of Pangaea, that all the earth (landmass) on the planet at the time was encompassed within the Supercontinent.

== See also ==
- Toponymy
- Etymology
- Onomastics
- List of country-name etymologies
- Lists of etymologies
- List of river name etymologies
