= Tynes =

Tynes is a surname. Notable people with the surname include:

- Andrew Tynes (born 1972), Bahamian sprinter
- Buddy Tynes (1902–1984), American football player
- Dustin Tynes (born 1996), Bahamian swimmer
- Gunnar Örn Tynes (born 1979), Icelandic music producer
- John Scott Tynes (born 1971), American writer
- Lawrence Tynes (born 1978), Scottish-born American football player
