= Garang =

Garang is a common name used by the Dinka people of South Sudan. The name has different definitions among the Dinka people i.e. the Bor Community or Twic East Community. They refer it to the God of women. In Bahr el Ghazal the name can be defined as God, which may be refer to Garang Abuk. Garang may refer to:

- Garang Diing Akuong, South Sudanese ambassador to the United States
- Garang Kuol, Australian footballer
- Gatluak Deng Garang, South Sudanese politician and general
- John Garang, former vice president of Sudan and leader of the Sudan People's Liberation Army
- Joseph Garang, a southern Sudanese communist politician in the 1960s
