= Okraina =

Okraina (Russian: Окраина, English: The outskirts) is the name of two films.

- Okraina (1933 film), a Soviet film by Boris Barnet
- Okraina (1998 film), a Russian film by Pyotr Lutsik, loosely based on the 1933 film

Ukraina may also refer to

- Ukraina, Polish name for the country Ukraine
- Ukraina, Łódź Voivodeship, a village in central Poland

== See also ==
- Eastern Okraina
