= List of etymologies of administrative divisions =

This article provides a collection of the etymology of the names of administrative divisions. This page generally only deals with regions and provinces; cities and other localities and features may appear listed under the individual country, with a link below.

== Australia ==
=== States ===
- New South Wales: named with reference to Wales by Captain James Cook. For the etymology of Wales, see below.
- Queensland: named in honour of Queen Victoria
- South Australia: located in the south-central region of Australia
- Tasmania: named after Abel Tasman, who sighted the island in 1642; originally named by Tasman as Van Diemen's Land, after Anthony van Diemen, the colonial governor who commissioned Tasman's voyage
- Victoria: named in honour of Queen Victoria
- Western Australia: comprises the western third of Australia

=== Territories ===
==== Mainland ====
- Australian Capital Territory
- Northern Territory: territory in north-central Australia
- Jervis Bay Territory: bay named by Lieutenant Bowen in 1791 for the naval hero Admiral Sir John Jervis, 1st Earl of St. Vincent.

==== External ====
- Ashmore and Cartier Islands: named for Ashmore Reef islets and Cartier Island
  - Ashmore Reef: first recorded sighting by a European, Captain Samuel Ashmore of the Hibernia, 11 June 1811
  - Cartier Island: discovered by a Captain Nash, aboard the Cartier
- Christmas Island: bestowed by Captain William Mynors of the British East India Company for its discovery on Christmas Day, 25 December 1643.
- Cocos (Keeling) Islands:
  - Cocos Islands: for the plentiful coconuts (Cocos nucifera) growing there
  - Keeling Islands, an alternate name: for their discovery by Captain William Keeling of the English East India Company in 1609.
- Coral Sea Islands: uninhabited islands in the Coral Sea, named for its coral formations, especially the Great Barrier Reef, the largest coral reef in the world.
- Heard Island and McDonald Islands:
  - Heard Island: discovered (first confirmed sighting) by Captain John Heard of the merchant vessel Oriental, 25 November 1853
  - McDonald Islands: discovered by Captain William McDonald, 4 January 1854
- Norfolk Island (Norfuk: Norfuk Ailen): discovered and named by James Cook (1774) for Duchess Mary Howard, Duchess of Norfolk

== Austria ==
=== States ===
- Burgenland (German; Hungarian: Várvidék; Croatian: Gradišće): originally called Vierburgenland, "Land of four Burgs (castles)", a name suggested in 1919 from the endings of the four former counties forming the state: Preßburg, Wieselburg, Ödenburg and Eisenburg. In 1922 Austria ceded Ödenburg to Hungary and dropped the numeric prefix Vier- ("four"); the remaining three counties became Burgenland.
- Carinthia, German Kärnten: etymologically related to the early Slavic medieval principality Carantania (Slovenian Karantanija, German Karantanien); a suggested etymology references a Celtic term for "stone" or "crag", while a popular etymology holds that the name means "land of friends"
- Lower Austria, German Nieder-Österreich: the lower part (lower in height) of the original territory of Austria ('the eastern country'), as opposed to Upper Austria; also called Österreich unter der Enns "Austria below the (river) Enns"
- Salzburg: after the city of Salzburg (literally "salt castle"), which takes its name from the salt mines that existed there during the Middle Ages
- Styria, German Steiermark: after the castle of Steyr; in the high Middle Ages, it formed a march of the Holy Roman Empire, hence -mark
- Tirol: after the Tirol Castle near Meran
- Upper Austria, German Ober-Österreich: the upper (physically higher) part of the original territory of Austria, as opposed to Lower Austria; also called Österreich ob der Enns "Austria above the (river) Enns"
- Vienna, German Wien: from Celtic Vindobona (vindo "white" + bona "foundation, fort")
- Vorarlberg, literally "in front of the Arlberg", takes its name from the Arlberg, a mountain (German: Berg) with a high mountain pass, characterised by Arle, a local German term for "mountain pine".

== Belgium ==
=== Regions ===
- Brussels, Dutch Brussel, French Bruxelles (the capital city, outside any province; also Belgium's third region): medieval Dutch broek 'bog' + zele (in many place names in the Low Countries="habitation using thatching")
- Flanders, Dutch Vlaanderen, French Flandre(s): plural of a terrain type; or "flooded land"; or a compound Flemish vlakte "plain" and wanderen "to wander". The name extended from the historical county (about half lost to French and Dutch neighbours; the rest roughly made up two administrative provinces, East Flanders and West Flanders; in French les Flandres, plural) to the whole Dutch-speaking, majority part of Belgium (French la Flandre, singular)
- Wallonia, French Wallonie: from the (Romanized (Germano-) Celtic, now Francophone) Walloon people: as in many European countries, so named by Germanic neighbours; meaning: "strangers". Compare "Wales" below.

=== Provinces ===
- Antwerp: from the city of Antwerp, the province's capital, which may derive from the Frankish anda ("against") and a noun derived from the verb werpen ("to throw").
- Brabant (now divided for administrative purposes into Flemish Brabant and Walloon Brabant): The name in Carolingian times appeared in Latinised form as pagus Bracbatensis, from bracha "new" and bant "region". See also under the Netherlands.
- East and West Flanders; see Flanders, above.
- Hainaut: after the river Haine.
- Liège: of disputed etymology. The name Liège (also used by the city of Liège, the province's capital) may have the same origin as the ancient name of Paris, i.e. Lutetia; the German form, Lüttich, suggests this. Liège and Lutetia would both derive from Latin lucotætia, "marsh" or "mud". Another suggestion derives the names from Latin Lætica, "colony", or Leudica, "free". Alternatively, the Latin Leudica meaning "public place" may have given rise to the Walloon Lîdje and thence to Liège. Note that the name appeared in written form as Liége (with an acute accent) until the 1950s.
- Limburg: Derived from the castle-fortified town of Limbourg, which in turn was derived from "lint" "dragon" and burg "fortress". See also under the Netherlands.
- Luxembourg: identical with the independent country of the same name to the east. See List of country name etymologies#Luxembourg for the etymology of "Luxembourg".
- Namur: after the city of Namur, the province's capital, of uncertain etymology.

== Cambodia ==
- Banteay Meanchey Province: Ford of Victory in Khmer
- Battambang Province: Lost Staff in Khmer according to the legend of Preah Bat Dambang Kranhoung.
- Kampong Cham Province: Port of The Chams in Khmer
- Kampong Chhnang Province: Port of the Pots in Khmer
- Kampong Speu Province: Port of Carambola in Khmer
- Kampong Thom Province: According to legend two large snakes came to the port and it was named Kampong Pos Thom which means Large Snakes' Port in Khmer but passed through the years it was simplified to Kampong Thom which means Large Port in Khmer
- Kampot Province: Tetraodontidae in Khmer
- Kandal Province: Central in Khmer
- Koh Kong Province: Kong Island in Khmer
- Kep Province: Saddle of horse in Khmer
- Kratie Province: A kind of cosmetic powder in Khmer
- Mondulkiri Province: Mountain of Mandala
- Oddar Meanchey Province: Northern Victory in Khmer and Snaskrit
- Pailin Province: From the Word Phe Leng meaning Pinniped playing
- Phnom Penh: More information at Phnom Penh § Etymology
- Sihanoukville Province: Named after the former king, Norodom Sihanouk
- Preah Vihear Province: Sacred Temple named after Preah Vihear
- Pursat Province: According to legend, a type tree swings and it was grown in then it was called A type of tree swings
- Prey Veng Province: Long Forest
- Ratanakiri Province: Precious Gems Mountain
- Siem Reap Province: Siam Defeated, literally Siam Flat
- Stung Treng Province: Lake of Reeds
- Svay Rieng Province: Aligned Mangoes
- Takeo Province: Grandfather Keo

== Cameroon ==
=== Regions ===
- Adamaoua: From the Adamawa Emirate, a vassal state of the 19th-century Sokoto Caliphate. Adamawa comes from the name of its founder, Modibbo Adama. The suffix -wa is used in the Hausa language to signify the collective identity of 'people of' that place. Therefore, Adamawa means "the people of Adama".

== Canada ==
=== Historical regions ===
- Acadia (French Acadie): origin disputed:
  - # Credited to Italian navigator Giovanni da Verrazzano, who first named a region around Chesapeake Bay Archadia (Arcadia) in 1524 because of "the beauty of its trees", according to his diary. Cartographers began using the name Arcadia to refer to areas progressively farther north until it referred to the French holdings in maritime Canada (particularly Nova Scotia). The -r- also began to disappear from the name on early maps, resulting in the current Acadia.
  - # Possibly derived from the Míkmaq word akatik, pronounced roughly "agadik", meaning "place", which French-speakers spelled as -cadie in place names such as Shubenacadie and Tracadie, possibly coincidentally.
- Nunatsiavut: Inuktitut, meaning "our beautiful land".

== Chile ==
=== Regions ===
Roman numerals originally identified the regions in order from north to south (except Santiago). With the establishment of Arica-Parinacota and Los Ríos Region in 2007 the numbers no longer reflect the regions' positions.

- Maule Region (Spanish VII Región del Maule): named after the Maule River.
- Biobío Region (Spanish VIII Región del Biobío): named after the Bío-Bío River.
- Los Ríos Region (Spanish XIV Región de los Ríos): refers to the river systems of Valdivia and Bueno and to the nickname of the city of Valdivia. The name may also reflect the name of Los Lagos Region (Spanish for Region of the Lakes) from which Los Ríos split away.
- Aisén Region, sometimes also spelled Aysén (Spanish XI Región Aisén del General Carlos Ibáñez del Campo): The name Aisén may come from the Huilliche word achen, meaning "to crumble". Another theory suggests that the Chonos culture used the word to mean "going more to the interior", in reference to the Fjord of Aisén that stretches east from the Moraleda strait.
- Magallanes y Antártica Chilena Region (Spanish XII Región de Magallanes y de la Antártica Chilena): named in honour of Ferdinand Magellan, the Strait of Magellan and the city of Punta Arenas, formerly called Magallanes.

== China ==
=== Provinces ===
- Anhui (安徽) – lit. "Peaceful Badge", actually abbreviates Anqing & Huizhou
- Beijing (北京) – "Northern Capital"
- Chongqing (重慶) – "Doubled Celebration", named in 1189 by Emperor Guangzong of Song dynasty who was crowned as king and then emperor in short succession
- Fujian (福建) – lit. "Luck Builds", actually abbreviates Fuzhou & Jian'ou
- Gansu (甘肅) – lit. "Willingly Serious", actually abbreviates Ganzhou & Suzhou (肃州)
- Guangdong (廣東) – lit. "Eastern Expanses", actually contracts the earlier "Eastern Guangnan" (Guangnandong)
- Guangxi (廣西) – lit. "Western Expanses", actually contracts the earlier "Western Guangnan" (Guangnanxi)
- Guizhou (貴州) – lit. "Expensive Province", actually refers to Mount Gui
- Hainan (海南) – "South of the Sea", in reference to the Qiongzhou Strait, for the Hainan Island. Similarly, Leizhou Peninsula, which faces Hainan across the strait, is also called Haibei, meaning "North of the Sea".
- Hebei (河北) – "North of the [Yellow] River"
- Heilongjiang (黑龍江) – "Black Dragon River", the Chinese name for the Amur River, from its Manchu name Sahaliyan Ula ( ) ("Black River")
- Henan (河南) – "South of the [Yellow] River"
- Hubei (湖北) – "North of the Lake", in reference to Lake Dongting
- Hunan (湖南) – "South of the Lake", in reference to Lake Dongting
- Jiangsu (江蘇) – lit. "The River Revives", actually abbreviates Jiangning & Suzhou (苏州)
- Jiangxi (江西) – lit. "West of the [Yangtze] River" (although it is to the Yangtze's south), actually contracts the earlier "Western Jiangnan" (Jiangnanxi, "Western Region South of the River")
- Jilin (吉林) – lit. "Lucky Forest", actually a Sinification of Manchu girin ula (吉林乌拉) meaning "Riverside"
- Liaoning (遼寧) – lit. "Distant Peace", actually refers to "Peaceful Liao", the region around the Liao River
- Inner Mongolia (內蒙古) – from the perspective of Beijing, as distinguished from "Outer Mongolia", which became independent in the 20th century (Mongolia itself from "Land of the Mongols"; Mongol from the Mongolian for "brave")
- Ningxia (寧夏) – lit. "Peaceful Summer", actually refers to the Tibetan state of Western Xia
- Qinghai (青海) – "Blue Sea", for Qinghai Lake, from Mongolian (Köke Naghur)/Хөх нуур (Höh nuur)
- Shaanxi (陜西) – "West of the Pass(es)" or "West of Shanzhou". Shanzhou is named in reference to the three former channels of the Yellow River at Sanmenxia, previously supposed to have been cleft in the rock by Yu the Great and now submerged by the Sanmenxia Dam
- Shandong (山東) – "East of the [Taihang] Mountains"
- Shanghai (上海) – "On the ocean"
- Shanxi (山西) – "West of the [Taihang] Mountains"
- Sichuan (四川) – lit. "Four Rivers", actually refers to the four circuits of the region during the Song dynasty – Chengdufu, Kuizhou, Lizhou, and Zizhou; erroneously believed to refer to the four rivers in the region—Min, Tuo, Jialing and Wu.
- Tianjin (天津) – "Heavenly Ford", in honor of the Yongle Emperor's crossing at that point
- Tibet – from Tibetan: བོད་, Wylie: Bod (Böd) in the form Mtho-Böd 'High Tibet' or Stod-Böd 'Upper Tibet', or from Old Turkic Töbäd or Töpüt 'the heights'; the modern Chinese name 西藏 Xizang means 'Western Tsang", from the Sinification of Tibetan Tsang, the central-southern region of Tibet
- Xinjiang (新疆) – "The New Frontier"
- Yunnan (雲南) – lit. "South of the Clouds", actually refers to the Yunling Mountains
- Zhejiang (浙江) – "Crooked River", a former name of the modern Qiantang River

=== Special administrative regions ===
- Hong Kong – An Anglicized transcription of the Cantonese Chinese place name 香港 (Hoeng^{1}gong^{2}, "Fragrant Harbor"), originally the name of the small inlet now known as Aberdeen Harbour. The reference to fragrance may refer to the harbor waters sweetened by the estuarine influx of the Pearl River or to the incense factories lining the coast to the north of Kowloon which was stored around Aberdeen Harbour, prior to the development of Victoria Harbour. The name was applied to the entirety of Hong Kong Island in the 1842 Treaty of Nanking. The Kowloon Peninsula and New Territories were later added by the 1860 Convention of Peking and the 1898 Convention for the Extension of Hong Kong Territory.
- Macau – for the Cantonese Chinese pronunciation of 媽閣 (Maa^{5}gok^{3}), the name of temple of the sea goddess A-Ma, or A-Ma Gao (阿媽澳, "Bay of A-Ma"). The Chinese name of Macau (澳門) means "Inlet Gates". Also the English transcription is Macao.

== Czech Republic ==
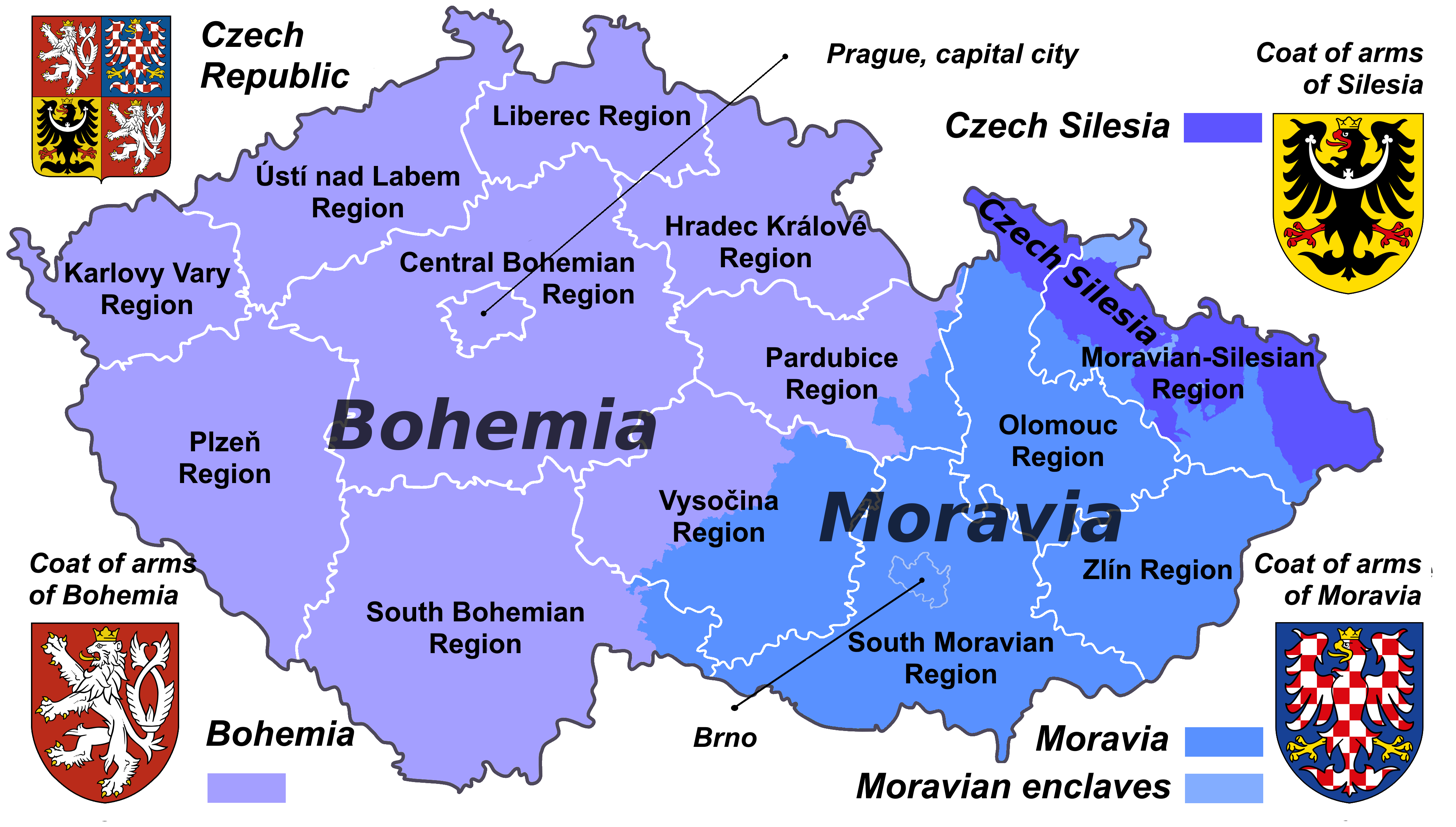
Map of the Czech Republic with traditional regions and current administrative regions

=== Historical regions ===
- Czech Republic/Czechia (Česko in Czech). From old Czech Czech (nationality), later written Čech. Until 19th century referred predominantly to Bohemia only, later the meaning has been extended to all Czech lands (Bohemia, Moravia and Czech Silesia). Traditionally traced to a Forefather Čech, who brought the Czechs into Bohemia.
- Bohemia: "Land of the Boii", a Celtic tribe of the region. The ultimate etymology of Boii is uncertain, but has been connected to Proto-Indo-European roots meaning "cow" and "warrior"
- Moravia: "Land of the Morava"
- Silesia – from the holy Silesian mountain of Ślęża
- Sudetenland – from the Sudeten mountains

== Denmark ==
Autonomous territories and geographic regions are

- Bornholm: The Old Danish form, Burghændeholm shows derivation with the suffix -und from burgh "fortress": "provided with a fortress", later combined with holm, "island". The similarity with the Germanic Burgundian tribe whose name has the same etymology and which may or may not have originated in Scandinavia, can be purely coincidental since the derivation is quite basic in meaning.
- Copenhagen (Danish: København): The Old Danish form, Køpmannæhafn shows the older genitive plural køpmannæ of køpman, "merchant", coupled with hafn, "harbor", producing the meaning "merchants' harbour". It has entered English via the (Low) German Kopenhagen.
- Danish Virgin Islands, a former territory: See British Virgin Islands below.
- Faroe Islands (Danish: Færøerne, Faroese: Føroyar): From Old Norse Færeyjar – literally, "Sheep Islands", from their dense population of sheep. Another theory suggests that the lexeme fær instead derives from Celtic and means "distant".
- Greenland (Danish: Grønland): From Old Norse Grœnland, literally, "green land"; so named by Erik the Red to induce settlement there. Greenlandic-speakers use the name Kalaallit Nunaat, meaning "Land of the Greenlanders"
- Jutland (Danish: Jylland; German: Jütland): From Old Danish Jutland, derived from the tribal name of the Jutes, combined with land "land".
- Zealand (Danish: Sjælland): Old Icelandic Selund, Latin rendering Selon, Old Danish Sialand. A somewhat later form, now poetic, is Sjølund. The oldest forms with the single l and the original vowel reveal that the name is derived with the suffix -und (cf. Bornholm above) from Old Danish *sial meaning either "seal" or "furrow": "provided with seals" or "provided with furrows", referring either to populations of seals or inlets from the sea. The suffix has later been reinterpreted as the lexeme land "land.

Present administrative regions of Denmark are

- Region Hovedstaden – "Capital City Region"
- Region Midtjylland – "Mid Jutland Region", see above for "Jutland"
- Region Nordjylland – "North Jutland Region", see above for "Jutland"
- Region Sjælland – "Region Zealand", see above for "Zealand"
- Region Syddanmark – "Region of Southern Denmark"

== Estonia ==
Note: Estonian maakond means "county" and maa means "land". Counties given here without the suffix -maa take their names (and etymologies as given here) from their capitals.

- Hiiumaa: from Estonian hiis – "holy grove", or hiid – "giant", meaning "land of holy groves" or "land of giants".
- Ida-Virumaa: "Eastern Virumaa" – see Virumaa below
- Jõgeva: from Estonian jõgi – "river" (Pedja river) and possibly vahe – "between" (since the old estate stood on an island in the river), meaning "between rivers".
- Järvamaa: from Estonian järv – "lake", meaning "land of lakes".
- Läänemaa: from Estonian lääne – "western", meaning "western land".
- Lääne-Virumaa: "Western Virumaa" – see Virumaa below
- Petseri: from Russian peshchera – "caves".
- Põlva: from Estonian põlv – "knee". According to a legend, a virgin was once bricked in a church wall on her knees. According to another version, the Tartu-Võru and Kanepi-Räpina roads form a curve, shaped like a knee.
- Pärnu: named after Pärnu river, that drains into the sea at Pärnu
- Saaremaa: from Estonian saar – "island", meaning "island-land".
- Valga: from German family names de Walco and de Walko. According to another version, from Old Estonian valketa – "white".
- Virumaa: from several Finnic languages virukas – "big" or "strong", or vire "sharp" or "penetrating" (for wind), meaning "land of the strong / big" or "land of the sharp / penetrating winds". (In Finnish, the words for Estonia and Estonians derive from Virumaa – Viro and virolaiset.)

== Finland ==
- Helsinki: The Swedish name Helsingfors (IPA: [helsiŋˈforsː] or [hɛlsɪŋˈfɔʂː]) represents the original official name of the city of Helsinki (in the very beginning, in the form 'Hellssingeforss'). The Finnish language form of the city's name probably originates from 'Helsinga' and similar names used for the river currently known as Vantaanjoki, as documented as early as the 14th century. Helsinki (pronounced with the stress on the first syllable: [ˈhelsiŋki]), refers to the city in all languages except Swedish and Norwegian. Helsingfors comes from the name of the surrounding parish, Helsinge (source for Finnish Helsinki) and the rapids (in Swedish: fors), which flowed through the original village. The name Helsinge possibly originated with medieval Swedish settlers who came from Hälsingland in Sweden. Another possible derivation looks to the Swedish word hals (neck), referring to the narrowest part of the river, i.e. the rapids.
- Ostrobothnia (or in Swedish: Österbotten) – "Eastern Bothnia". Bothnia is a Latinization of Old Norse botn, meaning "bottom". The name botn was applied to the Gulf of Bothnia as Helsingjabotn in Old Norse, after Hälsingland, which at the time referred to the coastland west of the gulf. Later, botten was applied to the regions Västerbotten on the western side and Österbotten the eastern side ("East Bottom" and "West Bottom"). The Finnish name of Österbotten, Pohjanmaa, or "Pohja"-land, gives a hint as to the meaning in both languages: pohja means both "bottom" and "north".
- Åland – "Waterland", from the proposed Germanic root *ahw-, cognate with Latin aqua and meaning "water". Ahvenanmaa, its Finnish name means "Land of Perch" and is partially borrowed, partially folk-etymologized from Germanic.
- Finland Proper: The first part of Finland to be colonised by Swedes, therefore called Finland, later the name Finland was extended to all the country.
- Uusimaa (Swedish: Nyland): means New Land, reflects the colonisation around the 13th-14th century.
- Lapland: land of the Lappi (the Sami people), same word as Lapland (Sweden)

== France ==
=== Historic regions ===
Most modern French départements take their names from local geographical features: usually rivers, occasionally mountain ranges or coasts. Thus most such names have a self-evident immediate origin. The traditional provinces and regions (of any period) often bear names with richer but more obscure histories.

- Alsace – from Latin Alsatia, a Latinised form of the Germanic name that also yields Old High German El-sasz (modern German Elsass), allegedly meaning "foreign settlement" (according to the OED article on "Alsatia"); or "settlement on the Ill River"
- Artois – from Latin Atrebatensis, adjectival form derived the Belgic tribe Atrebates, whose name comes from *ad-treb-ates, meaning 'inhabitants', based on the Celtic root treb- 'building', 'home' (cf. Old Irish treb 'building', 'farm', Welsh tref 'building', Middle Breton treff 'city', toponyms in Tre-, Provençal trevar 'to live in a house or in a village'). According to Alexander MacBain (d. 1907), the name Atrebates parallels the Irish aitreibh, 'building,' Early Irish aittreb, 'building,' and Welsh adref, 'homeward'. McBain states that the Celtic root treb corresponds to Latin tribus, 'tribe', and to English thorpe, 'village'. MacBain reconstructs *ad-treb- as the Proto-Celtic form of Early Irish aittreb. The name of the main city of Artois, Arras (Atrecht in Dutch) derives directly from the tribe's name Atrebates, so Artois properly means "territory of Arras".
- Basque Country (French: Pays Basque, Basque: Euskal Herria) – derived from the ancient tribe of the Vascones via the medieval Duchy of Vasconia and a County of Vasconia, split from it. The Basque name derives from Euskara (the autochthonous name of the Basque language).
  - Labourd (Lapurdi): from the Roman city of Lapurdum (modern Bayonne).
  - Lower Navarre (French: Basse Navarre, Basque: Nafarroa Behera, Benafarroa). From the medieval Kingdom of Navarre, itself of disputed etymology (either Basque nabar: "brownish, multicolor", also "ploughshare"; or Romance nava: "river bank"; or Basque naba (valley, plain) + herri (people, land)). Compare Kingdom of Navarre#Etymology
  - Soule: deformation of the original Basque name Zuberoa or Xiberue
- Brittany (Bretagne) – area occupied by refugee Britons from Roman Britain (Britannia) circa 500 AD
- Burgundy (Bourgogne) – part of the land settled by the East Germanic Burgundians, who possibly originated on the island now known as Bornholm. Speakers of Old Norse knew the island as Borgundarholm, and in ancient Danish especially the island's name appears as Borghand or Borghund; these names relate to Old Norse borg "height" and bjarg/berg "mountain, rock", as the island rises high from the sea. Other names known for the island include Burgendaland (9th century), Hulmo / Holmus (Adam of Bremen), Burgundehulm (1145), and Borghandæholm (14th century). Alfred the Great uses the form Burgenda land. Some scholars believe that the Burgundians take their name from the island of Bornholm; they comprised a Germanic tribe which moved west when the western Roman Empire collapsed, and occupied and named Burgundy in France in the 5th century CE.
- Champagne – from the Latin campania (plain, open country, battlefield). Compare "Campania", below.
- Corsica (Corse) – possibly from the Phoenician Korsai, which means something like "forest-covered"
- Dauphiné – from the nickname and coat of arms of former ruler Guy VIII of Vienne: "dolphin"
- Franche-Comté – in French, literally the "Free County" of Burgundy (as opposed to the Duchy of Burgundy)
- Gascony (Gascogne) – from the Duchy of Vasconia (also Wasconia), itself derived from the ancient tribe of the Vascones. In Latin and Romance languages in medieval times, Vascones came to apply to all the Basque-speaking peoples.
- Languedoc – the region speaking the langue d'oc (as opposed to the regions whose language (langue d'oïl) developed into modern French)
- Limousin – from an adjective referring to the local centre, Limoges
- Lorraine – from the Mediaeval Latin coining Lotharingia, meaning the lands granted as a kingdom in 855 AD to Lothair, son of the Holy Roman Emperor Lothair I
- Maine (province/county), from the Maine River, considered a variant/continuation of the Mayenne River, whose early French name suggests "middle river"
- Normandy (Normandie) – land settled by Viking Northmen in the early 10th century
- Occitania, from Occitània in Occitan. From medieval Latin Occitania (approximately since 1290). The first part of the name, Occ-, is from Occitan [lenga d']òc or Italian [lingua d']oc (i.e. "Language of Òc"), a name given to the Occitan language by Dante according to its way of saying "yes" (òc). The ending -itania is probably an imitation of the old Latin name [Aqu]itania.
- Provence – from Latin provincia (province), short for Provincia Narbonensis, the Roman province located in present-day southern France.
- Savoy – of unknown origin, but dating to the days of the Kingdom of Burgundy

=== Territories ===
- Clipperton Island, a territory: From the French Île de Clipperton, for the English mutineer and pirate John Clipperton who hid there in 1705.
- Europa Island, a territory: For the British ship Europa, which visited the island in 1774. For the etymology of Europe, see List of continent etymologies.
- French Guiana, a territory: See France and Guiana at List of country-name etymologies.
- French Polynesia, a territory: Polynesia formed from the Greek polynesia ("many islands"), a compound of polý- (πολύ, "many") and nēsos (νῆσος, "island").
- French Southern and Antarctic Lands, a territory: Self-descriptive. See France at List of country-name etymologies and List of continent-name etymologies.
  - Bassas da India, part of the French Southern and Antarctic Lands: Cartographic errors misspelling original name Portuguese Baixo da Judia ("Jewess Shoal") from the name of a Portuguese ship that ran aground on the reef.
- Glorioso Islands, a territory: Presumably from their glorious appearance.
- Guadeloupe, a territory: From Spanish Guadalupe, bestowed by Christopher Columbus in 1493 in honor of Santa María de Guadalupe in Extremadura, Spain.
- Juan de Nova, a territory: For João da Nova, a 15th-century Portuguese explorer-navigator.
- Martinique, a territory: Bestowed by Christopher Columbus in honor of Saint Martin of Tours in 1502
- Mayotte, a territory: A French corruption of the native Maore or Mawuti, sultanates on the island around the year 1500.
- New Caledonia, a territory: "New Scotland" from the Latin Caledonia, bestowed by British captain James Cook in 1774 after a supposed resemblance. For further etymology of "Caledonia", see Scotland below.
- Réunion, a territory: Selected in 1793 to commemorate the union of revolutionaries from Marseille with the French National Guard in Paris on 10 August 1792. (For earlier names, see History of Réunion.)
- Territorial Collectivity of Saint-Pierre and Miquelon (French: Collectivité territoriale de Saint-Pierre-et-Miquelon), an overseas collectivity:
  - Saint Pierre: From the French for "Saint Peter", patron of fishermen.
  - Miquelon: From the Basque for "Michael", possibly for Saint Michael, published by Martin de Hoyarçabal's pilot in 1579 as Micquetõ and Micquelle, after which it evolved over time into Miclon, Micklon, and finally Miquelon.
- Tromelin Island: From the French Île Tromelin in honor of the Chevalier de Tromelin, a French Royal Navy officer who commanded the French corvette La Dauphine which visited the island in 1776.
- Territory of the Wallis and Futuna Islands (French: Territoire des îles Wallis et Futuna), an overseas collectivity:
  - Futuna: From an endonym derived from the local futu ("Fish-poison tree")
  - Wallis: for the British explorer Samuel Wallis, who sailed there in 1797.

== Germany ==
=== States ===
- Baden-Württemberg: formed by combining the names of the former states of Baden and of Württemberg.
  - Baden: after the city of Baden-Baden, formerly Baden, the name became reduplicated to distinguish it from the state (as in "Baden in Baden"). The name means "baths", after the springs in the city.
  - Württemberg: after Württemberg Castle, which stood on the Württemberg, a hill in Stuttgart, formerly Wirtemberg, further origin uncertain (-berg means "mountain")
- Bavaria (German Bayern): the state of Bavaria developed out of the tribe of the Baiuvarii, who probably gained their name from the land of Bohemia
- Brandenburg: after the city of Brandenburg. The earlier Slavic name of the castle (Burg) of Brandenburg appears as Branibor (Slavic for "Branim's forest", where bor means "a dense forest").
- Hamburg: from the 9th-century name Hammaburg, where Hamma has multiple conflicting interpretations, but burg means "castle".
- Hesse: after the tribe of the Chatti
- Lower Saxony (German Niedersachsen): after the tribe of the Saxons. "Lower Saxony" became differentiated in modern times from the state of Saxony to its southeast. The word "lower" reflects Lower Saxony's location in the lowlands of the North German Plain, as opposed to Saxony, which has a higher elevation. See below for etymology of "Saxony".
- Mecklenburg-Western Pomerania (German) Mecklenburg-Vorpommern): formed geographically by joining Mecklenburg with the western part of Pomerania, also called Hither Pomerania.
  - Mecklenburg takes its name from Mecklenburg Castle in Dorf Mecklenburg (Burg means "castle" in German, the first part means "big": compare Middle Low German mekel, cognate with English mickle—"big castle").
  - Pomerania (German Pommern) comes from Slavic roots meaning "near the sea" (in Slavic languages more means "sea"): the standard modern Polish name for the region, Pomorze, demonstrates this well.
- North Rhine-Westphalia (German Nordrhein-Westfalen)—geographically formed by joining the northern part of the Rhineland (after the River Rhine) with Westphalia.
  - The name of the Rhine derives from Gaulish Renos, and ultimately from the Proto-Indo-European root *reie- ("to move, flow, run"); words like river and run share the same root. The Reno River in Italy shares the same etymology. The spelling with -h- suggests a borrowing from the Greek form of the name, Rhenos, seen also in rheos, "stream", and rhein, "to flow".
  - Westphalia formed the westernmost subdivision of the Saxon tribe; the origin of the second part (-falen in German) remains unknown
- Rhineland-Palatinate (German Rheinland-Pfalz): formed geographically by joining parts of the Rhineland (see above under North Rhine-Westphalia) with the Rhenish Palatinate, formerly a palatine county located near the Rhine, meaning that its count administered a palace of the Holy Roman Emperor.
  - The word Palatinate derives from Latin palatinus "imperial", from palatium "palace", after the location of the palace of the Roman Emperor Augustus on the Palatine Hill in Rome
- Saarland: after the Saar River
- Saxony (German Sachsen): land of the Saxons (possibly the "sword-folk"). The state of Saxony developed out of the Saxon tribe, which principally inhabited present-day Lower Saxony; during the Middle Ages and early modern times, the name migrated to the current location of the state of Saxony
- Saxony-Anhalt (German, Sachsen-Anhalt): formed geographically by joining the Prussian Province of Saxony (see above under Saxony) with Anhalt
  - Anhalt takes its name from Anhalt Castle near Harzgerode; the origin of the name of the castle remains unknown
- Schleswig-Holstein: created by joining Schleswig and Holstein.
  - Schleswig takes its name from the City of Schleswig, which in turn derives its name from the Schlei bay and the Low German word wig for "trading place".
  - "Holstein" comes from a Saxon subtribe named, in Latin, Holcetae, whose means "dwellers in the wood" (Northern Low Saxon: Hol(t)saten; German: Holzsassen).
- Thuringia (German Thüringen) – after the tribe of the Thuringii.

=== Historic regions ===
- Brunswick (German: Braunschweig): from the town of Brunswick, possibly originating as "Bruno's wik" (Bruno's marketplace) (with reference to the legendary founder Bruno, Duke of Saxony, died 880, or another Bruno) or as "burnt wik"); the High German form Braunschweig is an erroneous translation of the original Low German Brunswick
- Franconia (German: Franken): from the traditional designation "Franks", referring especially to the Kingdom of the East Franks. The name refers to those areas east of the Rhine that were first occupied by the Franks, as opposed to areas that were held by the Swabians, Bavarians or Saxons.
- Hohenzollern: ultimately from the names of Hohenzollern Castle and its location, Mount Hohenzollern (known locally as Zoller or Zollern). The lexeme hoh/hohen in German means "high/height".
- Oldenburg, after the city of Oldenburg, first recorded in 1108 as the town of Aldenburg, subsequently also a county, duchy, grand duchy and republic, meaning "old castle"
- Prussia (German: Preußen) – (at times historically connected with Germany or with parts thereof): from the people known as the Prussians, a grouping of western Balt peoples whose collective name (German: Prussen or anciently Pruzzen) may possibly derive from an Indo-European root meaning "swamp": see Old Prussians; for political reasons, the electors of Brandenburg decided to name themselves kings of Prussia in the 18th century; in this way, they transferred the name of the remote eastern region to a major German state
- Swabia (German: Schwaben or Schwabenland): after the tribe of the Suebi whose name may come from Proto-Germanic *swēbaz based on the Proto-Germanic root *swē- meaning "one's own" [people], from an Indo-European root *swe-, the third-person reflexive pronoun.

== Greece ==
- Arcadia: from Arcas, the legendary eponymous leader of early Hellenic settlers
- Sparta: from Greek Σπάρτη spartē, a cord or rope made from the shrub spartos, a type of broom
- Macedonia, from Greek mak- (long, tall)—'highland'.

== Indonesia ==
- Aceh: name of the coastal people of the area (the main group inhabiting the inland area are the Gayo people).
- Banten: named in the honor of the former Banten Sultanate, which ruled over the region from 16th to the 18th centuries and became one of the main fronts of opposition against the colonial might of the Dutch East India Company (VOC).
- Bengkulu: named after the Bengkulu river, which passes through the area of the province. The name of Bengkulu itself comes from the Malay word bangkai meaning "corpse", and hulu meaning "river-source"—it refers to the story that in the past the area near the source of the river Bengkulu had often served as a battlefield—tribes and clans battled each other on the river banks leaving them full of corpses and blood.
- Gorontalo: from the Dutch version of the local phrase hulontalo, meaning "lands surrounded by water" due to the many lakes and rivers formerly in the area
- Irian Jaya: The name Irian is said to come from the Biak language. An alternative etymology for Irian stems from the acronym Ikut Republik Indonesia, Anti Nederland ("Join/Follow the Republic of Indonesia, rejecting The Netherlands) (see the article on the Province of Papua—as of 2009 the official Indonesian and internationally recognized name for Irian Jaya). The word jaya means "victory" or "glorious" in Indonesian, referring to the Indonesian victory over the colonisers who controlled the area both militarily and diplomatically, a sign of pride as the Indonesians showed themselves capable not only of defending their lands from the Dutch attempt to reestablish colonial rule after World War II, but also of taking over lands not included in the 1945 proclamation or the 1950 reunification, specifically Irian Jaya or the province of Papua.
- Jakarta: from the Javanese words jaya (meaning "victory") and karta (meaning "glory"), which make up the phrase "victorious & glorious; this refers to the victory of Prince Pati Unus (also known as Fatahillah) of the Demak Sultanate in his campaign to defeat the rival Malacca Sultanate of the Malay Peninsula and Samudera Pasai Sultanate of Aceh region in the mid-16th century. The "glorious victory" also refers to the event of Indonesian Proclamation of Independence on 17 August 1945 which took place in the city.
- Jambi: the province takes its name from the historical Jambi Sultanate which ruled over the area from the 17th to the 19th centuries
- Lampung: From the word "Lambung" in the Old Malay phrase anjak Lambung, which means "descended from the heights". This refers to the ancestral riddle of the Lampung people, who allegedly had ancestors "descended from the heights". The "heights" reference the southernmost part of the Barisan mountain range that runs through all the western part of the Lampung province.
- Nusa Tenggara: from Nusa meaning "islands" (referring to the Lesser Sunda Islands that make up the area) and tenggara meaning "south-east" (referring to the position of the area within the country).
- Sulawesi: possibly from the words sula ("island") and besi ("iron") and may refer to the historical export of iron from the rich Lake Matano iron deposits.
- Sumatra: from Ibn Battuta's 14th-century pronunciation of the name of the Samudra Kingdom (13th to 15th centuries CE)
- Yogyakarta: From 'Jogja' and 'Karta'. Jogja is a Javanised version of a Sanskrit word, 'Ayodhya', the prefix A- meaning 'not' and 'Yodhya' is synonymous to Hindi 'Yuddha', meaning battle, combat, fight, or war. Thus Ayodhya, which later Javanised into Jogja, meant 'The place of no fight' or in simpler interpretation, peaceful. This may refer to the geographic location of Jogjakarta, being fortified naturally by the Java Sea to the South, the Merapi Mountain to the north, the Gunung Sewu Karst Mountains to the east and Progo River to the west where it would be the perfect fortress of peace, and even more supported as a breeding place of peaceful life with its rich and fertile volcanic land and rivers, sourcing up to the majestic Merapi. The word 'Karta' means glory, referring to a hope that this city would bring glory to its people.

== Iran (Persia) ==
- Lorestan: land of the Lurs
- Mazendran: its combination of 3 words: Mad (female, mother, mater) and Zainthi (wisdom, knowledge, science) Eran (aryans), Both MAD and Eran is either suffix or prefix of many places in greater Iran or Persia Europeans called + upper India

== Iraq ==
- Iraqi Kurdistan: The name Kurdistan literally means Land of the Kurds, believed to mean nomad in the Proto-Iranian language. In the Iraqi Constitution, it is referred to as Kurdistan Region.[5] The full name of the government is "Kurdistan Regional Government" (abbrev: KRG).

== Ireland (Éire) ==
- Connacht: Connachta in Irish. "Descendants of Conn". From the Irish Connachta people, who all claimed descent from the High King Conn Cétchathach, Conn of the Hundred Battles.
- Leinster: Laighin in Irish. From the Irish Laigin people, named after láigne, the broad blue-grey iron spearheads they carried, and Old Norse staðr, meaning place or territory.
- Munster: Mhumhain in Irish. From the Gaelic goddess Muman and the old Norse staðr, meaning place or territory.
- Ulster: Ulaidh in Irish. From the Irish Ulaid people, whose name probably comes from Old Irish ul, "beard", and old Norse staðr, meaning place or territory.
- Meath: Mide in Irish. "Middle" in Old Irish. No longer a province of Ireland.

== Italy ==
- Abruzzo: Aprutium in medieval Latin (6th century), a name by which the "County of Teramo" was known; in turn, Aprutium perhaps derives from the ancient people of Praetutii, who inhabited the territory in pre-Roman times.
- Aosta Valley (Valle d'Aosta): From the valley where Aosta rises, which owes its name to its ancient Latin name of Augusta Pretoria.
- Apulia (Puglia): From Apulia, a toponym used in pre-Roman times to indicate a territory corresponding to the current north-central Apulia. In turn, Apulia derived from the indigenous toponym "Japudia" (parallel to the Greek term Ἰαπυγία, then Latinized to lapygia), with a passing from D to L, typical of italic languages or, more precisely, Osco-Sabellic.
- Basilicata: From the Greek basilikos (royal, imperial), appeared during the 7th century and used to designate Bizantine Themi governors. Basilikos means "King official", being adjective of basileus, "king"; Basilicata is a term referred to the period when the region belonged to the Eastern Roman Empire. In ancient times it was also known as "Lucania", a term that either originated from the pre-Romani people named Lucani (who took their name from the eponymous hero Lucus or by the Latin term "lucus", meaning sacred wood) or by the Greek for wolf: lykos. Another supported theory indicates that the term may have originated from the ancient Anatolian people of Lici, which would be established in the area of their original land: Licia.
- Calabria: a Roman times toponym at the time referred to the Salentine Peninsula, now part of Apulia, that may be originated from a pre-Indo-European mediterranean root cal-/cala- or calabra/galabra-, meaning "rock", "calcareous concretion".
- Campania: From the homonymous Latin name, coming from the Campanians people, the ethnonym would come from campus, "open field, countryside", since this people was completely dedicated to agriculture; the first meaning of the Region name was the equivalent of "Land of Work", a name that was given to it for the same reason. Compare "Champagne", above.
- Emilia-Romagna: Emilia derives from the Via Aemilia, a main trading route, that takes its name from its builder, Marco Emilio Lepido, from the Aemilia gens. Romagna derives from Romania (Roman territory).
- Friuli-Venezia Giulia; Friuli derives from Latin Forum Iulii "Forums of Giulio", name of Cividale del Friuli, in honour of Julius Caesar; Venezia Giulia was instead proposed by Graziadio Isaia Ascoli, to identify all the areas inhabited by Italian people but still in the hands of the Austro-hungarian empire after 1866.
- Lazio: From Latin "Latium", given to the Region by the Latins (Italic tribe); in turn the toponym may be deriving from the size of their territory, being it wide, flat or large (latus in Latin). Ovid hints at perhaps a slightly more sophisticated folk etymology, with a legend of the naming of Latium after Saturn latente deo (as a god in hiding) after he allegedly fled to Italy following his expulsion by Jupiter. Modern linguists postulate origins in a Proto-Indo-European language (PIE) root *stela- (to spread, extend), expressing the idea of "flat land" (in contrast to the local Sabine high country). But the name may originate from an earlier, non-Indo-European one. See the Online Etymological Dictionary.
- Liguria: From the homonymous Latin toponym, the ancient pre-Romani people of Ligures, in greek Λιγυες, Ligues and in Latin Ligures, of uncertain origin, mentioned from the 7th century BC to the 5th century BC.
- Lombardy: from the medieval Latin "Langobardia", Land of the Lombards, a germanic population that invaded the Italian peninsula in 568, making Pavia its own reign capital.
- Marche: from the plural of Marca, identifying a frontier territory, developed to designate the territory on a political and administrative level during the early Middle Ages, referring to the period in which the Region was at the border of Charlemagne Empire during the 8th century.
- Molise: Derives from a toponym registered for the first time during the early Middle Ages, indicating a Normans' county, like "Castello di Molise" (Molise Castle), which name may be originated from the Latin "Molensis".
- Piedmont: From the expression that alludes to the Region morphology, at the foot of the mountains, particularly at the foot of the Western Alps.
- Sardinia: From the Latin Sardinia and the name of its ancient inhabitants, Sardi. It is unclear how those populations did define themselves, while it is possible that the etnonym derived from Sherden people.
- Sicily: From the Latin Sicilia and the Greek Sikelia, by the name of the people who inhabited the island, Sicels, who may had originated from the centre of Italy but moved then to the eastern side of Trinacria. Yet since the 2nd century BC, the Latin term Siculus has lost every ethnolinguistic connotation, indicating who is born or lives on the island.
- Trentino-Alto Adige/Südtirol: Trentino derived from the Latin Tridentinus, adjective of Tridentum, Trento, identifying the area of its Autonomous province. Alto Adige alludes to the upper course of the river Adige and identifies the area of Bolzano's Autonomous province.
- Tuscany: From the medieval Latin "Tuscania", having as an adjective Tuscanus, from the late Latin Tuscia, from the adjective Tuscus, plural Tusci, in turn from a previous Truscus, shortening of Etruscus, plural Etrusci, Etruscan civilization, the inhabitants of the Region during the pre-Roman times.
- Umbria: From the Latin Umbria, from the ancient Umbri people; it's unclear the provenance of their etnonym. An hypothesis was proposed by Pliny the Elder in the "Natural History (Pliny)": "The umbrian population is estimated to be the most ancient of Italy; in facts, we believe that Umbri have been called Ombrii by the Greeks, since they may be survived to the rains when their land was flooded by the Flood". "Ombros" in Greek and "Imbris" in Latin means "rain, downpour".
- Veneto; From the ancient pre-Roman Adriatic Veneti, also known as Paleoveneti, mentioned by some main historical figures like: Julius Caesar, Tacitus and Pliny the Elder; the Indo-European root detected at the origin of this name is wen, to love, so Veneti may be the "lovely and friendly ones".

== Japan ==
=== Main Islands ===
- Honshu: "Main Province" in Japanese
- Kyushu: "Nine Provinces" in Japanese, in reference to the Chikuzen, Chikugo, Hizen, Higo, Buzen, Bungo, Hyūga, Ōsumi, and Satsuma provinces of 7th-century Saikaidō (See: Gokishichidō)
- Shikoku: "Four States" in Japanese, in reference to the Awa, Tosa, Sanuki and Iyo provinces of 7th-century Nankaidō (See: Gokishichidō)
- Hokkaido: "Northern Sea Circuit" in Japanese, a compromise archaism selected by bureaucrats during the Meiji Restoration (See: Naming of Hokkaido)

== Korea ==
- Chungcheong – from the first characters in the city names Chungju and Cheongju.
- Gangwon (South Korea) /Kangwŏn (North Korea) – from the first characters in the city names Gangneung and Wonju.
- Gyeonggi – the Hanja for the name mean "area around the capital", referring to the location of the province around Seoul, South Korea
- Gyeongsang – from the first characters in the city names Gyeongju and Sangju.
- Hamgyŏng – from the first characters in the city names Hamju and Kyŏngsŏng (?).
- Hwanghae – from the first characters in the city names Hwangju and Haeju.
- Jeolla – from the first characters in the city names Jeonju and Naju (The first character of Naju is actually "ra"—"r" changes to "n" in the initial position, and the combination "nr" changes to "ll" due to phonological characteristics of the Korean language).
- P'yŏngan – from the first characters in the city names P'yŏngyang and Anju.

== Laos ==
- Attapeu (ອັດຕະປື) – from "Idkabue" (meaning, 'buffalo dropping').
- Bokeo (ບໍ່ແກ້ວ) – Bo (ບໍ່) in Lao can mean "source", and keo or kaew (ແກ້ວ) in Lao means "Gem".
- Bolikhamxai (ບໍລິຄໍາໄຊ) –
- Champasak (ຈຳປາສັກ) –
- Huaphanh (ຫົວພັນ) –
- Khammuan (ຄໍາມ່ວນ) – Kham (ຄໍາ) in Lao means "gold", and Muan (ມ່ວນ) in Lao means "Joyous"
- Luang Namtha (ຫລວງນໍ້າທາ) – means "royal sugar palm" or "royal green river"
- Luang Prabang/Luang Phabang (ຫລວງພະບາງ) – Luang (ຫລວງ) in Lao means "Large" or "Grand", and Phabang (ພະບາງ) is the name of the buddha image which the city is named after.
- Udomxai (ອຸດົມໄຊ) –
- Phongsali (ຜົ້ງສາລີ) –
- Salavan – one million days
- Savannakhet (ສະຫວັນນະເຂດ) – derives from Savanh Nakhone ('heavenly district' or 'land of fertility suitable for agriculture'). Savanh (ສະຫວັນ) in Lao means "Heaven" and Nakhet (ນະເຂດ) in Lao means "District"
- Vientiane/Vieng Chan (ວຽງຈັນ) – city of sandalwood. Vieng (ວຽງ) in Lao means "city" and Chan (ຈັນ) in Lao means "Moon" or "Sandalwood"
- Sainyabuli (ໄຊຍະບູລີ) – The name is derived from the Sanskrit words sena ('army') and puri ('city').
- Xekong (ເຊກອງ) –
- Xaisomboun (ໄຊສົມບູນ) –
- Xieng Khwang (ຊຽງຂວາງ) – Xieng or Xiang (ຊຽງ) in Lao means "City" and Khwang (ຂວາງ) in Lao means "Horizontal"

== Malaysia ==
- Alor Star – alor in Malay means "furrow", while star refers to a kind of tree (Bouea macrophylla) that bears small, sour fruit known as kundang or remia in Malay
- Cyberjaya – Malay: "cyber excellence", a reference to the city's designation as the "Silicon Valley of Malaysia"
- Ipoh – named after the ipoh tree whose poisonous sap the Orang Asli used to coat their blowpipe darts with
- Johor – from Arabic jauhar, or "precious stones"
- Kangar – named for the Malay 'kangkok', a kind of hawk (Spizaetus Limnaetu)
- Kelantan – said to be a corruption of gelam hutan, the Malay name for the Melaleuca leucadendron tree, also possibly derived from kilatan ("lightning")
- Klang – possibly from Mon-Khmer klong or Malay kilang ("warehouse")
- Kota Bharu – Malay: "new town/fort"
- Kota Kinabalu - The word of "kota" means city in Malay while the word of "kinabalu" derived from the Kadazandusun aki nabalu ("grandfather" for aki, and "mountain" for nabalu)
- Kuala Lumpur – Malay: "muddy confluence", a reference to the founding of the city at the confluence of Gombak River and Klang River
- Kuching - Malay: "cat", but probably a corruption of the Indian cochin ("port") or a reference to the mata kucing trees that used to proliferate where the city grew subsequently
- Labuan – derived from the Malay labuhan ("anchorage")
- Langkawi – Malay for "eagle island", but possibly related to Langkasuka, an ancient Hindu kingdom founded in Kedah in the 1st century CE
- Malacca – named by the founder of Malacca, Parameswara, after the Melaka tree under which he sheltered
- Negeri Sembilan – Malay: "nine states", a reference to the nine original districts (or nagari) settled by the Minangkabau
- Penang – named after the Pinang tree
- Perak – Malay: "silver", from the silvery colour of tin for which the area is known or possibly from the "glimmer of fish in the water"
- Putrajaya – Malay: literally: "the son's victory"; but taken to mean "princely excellence". Named after the first Prime Minister of Malaysia, Tunku Abdul Rahman Putra, possibly with reference to the planned city's status as the new administration centre for the Federal Government
- Selangor – possibly from the Malay selangau ("fly") due to the abundance of flies along the Selangor River
- Sungai Petani – literally "farmer river" in Malay, said to originate from the concentration of paddy-fields and farmers in the state
- Taiping – Chinese: "great peace"

== Mongolia ==
- Arkhangai: from the Mongolian: Ar (north; back side of a mountain) and Khangai Mountains
- Bayan-Ölgii: from the Mongolian: Bayan (rich), Ölgii (cradleregion), a province later built in the 1940s especially for some Kazakh tribes migrated to Mongolia in the early 1910s for land.
- Bayankhongor:
- Bulgan: from the Mongolian: Darkhan (great) and Uul (mountain)
- Darkhan-Uul: from the Mongolian: Darkhan (great) and Uul (mountain)
- Dornod: from the Mongolian: Dornod (the east)
- Dornogovi: from the Mongolian: Dorno (east) and Gobi Desert (Govi in Mongolian)
- Dundgovi: from the Mongolian: Dund (middle) and Gobi Desert (Govi in Mongolian)
- Govi-Altai: after the Gobi Desert (Govi in Mongolian) and the Altai Mountains
- Govisümber:
- Khentii: after the Khentii Mountains
- Khovd: after Khovd River
- Khövsgöl: after Khövsgöl Lake
- Ömnögovi: from the Mongolian: Ömnö (South) and Gobi Desert (Govi in Mongolian)
- Orkhon: after the Orkhon River
- Övörkhangai: from the Mongolian: Övör (south;front side of a mountain) and Khangai Mountains
- Selenge: after the Selenge River
- Sükhbaatar: after Damdin Sükhbaatar, a Mongolian military leader in the revolution of independence.
- Töv: from Mongolian: Töv (center)
- Uvs: after Uvs Lake
- Zavkhan: after Zavkhan River
- Ulaanbaatar: from Mongolian: Ulaan (red), baatar (hero)

== Morocco ==
- Western Sahara, claimed territory: After its geographic position. "Sahara" derives from the Arabic aṣ-Ṣaḥrā' (الصحراء), meaning "desert". The area is also claimed by the Sahrawis.

== Kingdom of the Netherlands ==
=== Constituent countries ===
- Aruba: Uncertain. One etymology derives from Spanish Oro Hubo ("there was gold"); another cites the Arawak oibubai ("guide").
- Curaçao: Uncertain. One etymology derives from Portuguese curaçao ("healing"); another from Portuguese coração ("heart"); another that it is a local endonym.
- Netherlands (Dutch: Nederland): "Lowlands". See List of country name etymologies#Netherlands.
- Sint Maarten: Southern part of the island of Saint Martin, which was named for Saint Martin of Tours, as it was first sighted by Christopher Columbus on St. Martin's Day (11 November), 1493.

=== Provinces ===
- Drenthe (Dutch Low Saxon: Drentie): first mentioned in a Latin document of 820 as pago Treanth. Treanth probably finds its origin in the number three, as the area was then divided in three jurisdictions.
- Flevoland: from Latin Lacus Flevo (Lake Flevo), a name used in Roman sources to refer to a body of water at what would later become known as the Zuiderzee. The Netherlands government established the province in 1986 on lands reclaimed from the Zuiderzee in the 1950s and 1960s.
- Friesland (West Frisian: Fryslân): land of the Frisians.
- Gelderland (also English: Guelders): Named after the modern city of Geldern, Germany.
- Groningen (Gronings: Grönnen or Grunnen). Named after its capital city. The origin of the city name is uncertain; theories include an original meaning of "people of Groni" (a man's name) or "green fields".
- Limburg: Derived from the castle-fortified town of Limbourg which in turn was derived from "lint" "dragon" and burg "fortress". See also under Belgium.
- North Brabant (Dutch: Noord-Brabant). The name in Carolingian times appeared in Latinised form as pagus Bracbatensis, from bracha "new" and bant "region". See also under Belgium.
- North Holland (Dutch: Noord-Holland): Northern part of the region of Holland. See List of country name etymologies#Netherlands for the etymology of "Holland".
- Overijssel: Dutch for "[Lands] across the IJssel river" (also Latin: "Transiselania")
- South Holland (Dutch: Zuid-Holland): Southern part of the region of Holland. See List of country name etymologies#Netherlands for the etymology of "Holland".
- Utrecht: named after the city of Utrecht, the name of which derives from Latin Ultraiectum ad Rhenum, meaning "place to cross the Rhine river".
- Zeeland (also English: Zealand): Dutch for "sea land".

=== Other names ===
- Alkmaar: from Aelcemaer, meaning 'lake of auks', due to the fact that lakes formerly surrounded the core of Alkmaar—all of them now drained and thus turned into dry land
- Amsterdam: from Amstelredam, which means "dam over the Amstel" (the river Amstel flows through present-day Amsterdam)
- Batavia (Germanic): "arable land" (derived from the regional name "Betuwe", as opposed to the other regional name "Veluwe" meaning "fallow" or "waste" land). Alternatively: the people known as the Batavians (Latin: Batavi) inhabited the island of Betawe between the Waal and the Rhine. The name of the island probably derives from batawjō ("good island", from Germanic bat—"good, excellent" and awjō—"island, land near water"), referring to the region's fertility.
- Bonaire: Uncertain, but thought to have been originally derived from the Caquetio word bonay. Later Dutch and Spanish colonists modified it, first to Bojnaj and finally to its current name of Bonaire (French: "good air").
- Holland (part of the Netherlands; but the term often refers to the country as a whole): Germanic "holt (i.e. wooded) land" (often incorrectly regarded as meaning "hollow [i.e. marsh] land")
- Netherlands Antilles, a territory: From their Dutch owners and from a mythical land or island (Antillia), west of Europe, or a combination of two Portuguese words ante or anti (possibly meaning "opposite" in the sense of "on the opposite side of the world") and ilha ("island"), currently the name for these Caribbean Islands.
- Rotterdam: meaning 'dam over the Rotte' (the river Rotte flows through present-day Rotterdam)
- Stad en Ommelanden for the province of Groningen, meaning "city and surrounding lands" and referring to the city of Groningen and the medieval Frisian lordships west, north and east of the city.
- Twente (region in the east of the province of Overijssel): from Latin tvihanti; or after the Germanic tribe the Tubantii as described by Tacitus; or an early form of the current Twents-language word for a 2-year-old horse: Tweanter.

== New Zealand ==
=== Provinces ===
- Auckland: in honour of George Eden, Earl of Auckland, a patron of William Hobson, who founded and named the city of Auckland. The Earl took his sobriquet from Auckland in Durham, United Kingdom, possibly deriving from the Celtic Alclet or Aclet, or "Cliffs of the Clyde". Although nowhere near the River Clyde, the locality may have had connections with the Celtic kingdom of Strathclyde; it may have borrowed the name of the Clyde for aesthetic or prestige reasons, as Alclet's river—the Gaunless—means "useless" in Old Norse; or a nearby river may have had the name "Clyde"—history does not record the name of the river Gaunless before the Norse named it
- Hawke's Bay: in honour of Edward Hawke, 1st Baron Hawke of Towton
- Marlborough: to commemorate John Churchill, 1st Duke of Marlborough
- Nelson: in honour of Horatio Nelson, 1st Viscount Nelson (the Admiral)
- Otago: anglicised from the Māori name Otakou, a kainga east of present-day Otago Harbour, originally meaning "one isolated village" or "place of red earth"
- Wellington: in honour of Arthur Wellesley, 1st Duke of Wellington

=== Other categories ===
- Cook Islands, a territory: In honor of British captain James Cook, who discovered the islands in 1770.
- Levin: from a director of the railway company that established the town to help boost its railway
- Niue, a territory: Niu probably means "coconut", and é means "behold". According to legend, the Polynesian explorers who first settled the island knew that they had come close to land when they saw a coconut floating in the water.
- Plimmerton: from John Plimmer, Wellington pioneer, director of the railway company that created the seaside resort to help boost its railway; central Wellington has Plimmer's Steps.
- Tasman: district named from the bay name, in honour of Dutchman Abel Tasman, commander of first European expedition to sight the country; also a mountain and glacier name. Abel Tasman National Park bears a fuller version of his name.
- Tokelau, a territory: From the Tokelauan "North" or "Northern", in reference to their position relative to Samoa. The Tokelauan people traditionally suppose themselves to have originated from settlers from Samoa.
- Waikato: Named after the Waikato River. The hydronym is a Māori-language word meaning "flowing water".

== Nigeria ==
=== States ===
- Adamawa: the state occupies most of the territory of the defunct 19th-century Adamawa Emirate, which stretched from northeastern Nigeria to northern Cameroon. The word Adamawa derives from the name of the founder of the emirate, Modibbo Adama. The original name for the emirate was Fombina (''southlands" in Fulfulde), named by the founder of the Sokoto Caliphate, Usman dan Fodio. However, it later came to be known as Adamawa, meaning "the people of Adama" in the Hausa language. The suffix -wa is appended in Hausa to signify the collective identity of 'people of' that place, so, Adamawa means "the people of Adama".

== Norway ==
=== Counties ===
- Akershus – Fortress of (the district) Aker (named after the farm Aker, meaning agriculture field)
- Agder – Agder has a pre-Viking Age unknown meaning. Maybe meaning coast, related to English edge.
  - Aust-Agder – East Agder.
  - Vest-Agder – West Agder.
- Buskerud – after a farm Buskerud, meaning the Bishops farm (rud more specifically means clearing the wood for farming)
- Finnmark – Land of the Sami people.
- Hedmark – Hed comes from the name of an old tribe. Mark means border land or wood land.
- Hordaland – land of the Charudes, an old tribe.
- Innlandet – Inner land, the land away from the coast.
- Møre og Romsdal – Møre, and Rom valley. Møre probably means sea (land at the sea) and Roms comes from the river Rauma, unknown meaning.
- Nordland – Northern land
- Oppland – the Upper lands
- Oslo – disputed, maybe "the meadow beneath the ridge", see History of Oslo's name
- Rogaland – Land of the Rugii, an old tribe.
- Sogn og Fjordane – Sogn refers to Sognefjord, "the fjord with tidal stream". Og Fjordane means "and the (other) fjords".
- Telemark – Tele comes from an old tribe. Mark means border land or wood land.
- Trøndelag – (Self-ruling) country of the Trønder people.
  - Nord-Trøndelag – North Trøndelag.
  - Sør-Trøndelag – South Trøndelag.
- Troms – Unknown
- Vestfold – West (side of) Fold, where Fold means fjord, here the Oslo Fjord.
- Vestland – Western land, traditional name of the west coast of Southern Norway
- Viken – the inlet; old name of the area (Viken) around the Oslo Fjord.
- Østfold – East (side of) Fold, where Fold means fjord, here the Oslo Fjord.

=== Territories ===
- Bouvet Island (Norwegian: Bouvetøya), a dependent territory: Named after the French explorer Jean-Baptiste Charles Bouvet de Lozier, who discovered it in 1739.
- Svalbard, a territory: A compound of Norse roots meaning "cold edge"

== Pakistan ==
- Khyber Pakhtunkhwa – modern name, from Khyber (Khyber Pass) + Pakhtunkhwa (Pashtunistan)
- Balochistan, Pakistan – from Persian for the wider Balochistan region (which includes Sistan and Baluchestan province, Iran and Balochistan, Afghanistan), Baloch + -stan
- Punjab, Pakistan – from Persian for the wider Punjab region (which includes Punjab, India), punj ("five") + ab ("waters", "river")
- Sindh, from Persian, from Sanskrit "Sindhu" (the Indus River and its lower delta region)
- Azad Jammu and Kashmir – modern name, from Azad ("free"; in Urdu) + Kashmir

== Papua New Guinea ==
- New Britain – in honour of Great Britain. Originally named by William Dampier in the Latin form Nova Britannia; called Neu-Pommern (New Pomerania) during the period of German colonization until the conquest of the area by Australia in 1914
- New Ireland – named after Ireland (with the Latin phrase Nova Hibernia) by Philip Carteret in 1767 when he established that it differed from nearby New Britain. (Officially known as New Mecklenburg (German: Neumecklenburg or Neu-Mecklenburg) during the period of German New Guinea from 1885 to 1914.)

== Poland ==
- Greater Poland – from the tribe of Polans or from the word "pole" (field) meaning "country of fields" – "Greater" distinguishes it from the whole Polish state
- Kuyavia – "covered by sand dunes"
- Lesser Poland – in contrast with Greater Poland
- Lower Silesia – in contrast to Upper Silesia
- Lubusz Land – from the town of Lubusz
- Masovia – "boggy"
- Masuria – from the Masovians, who settled Masuria
- Podlachia, "by Lachs", i.e., "by Poles"
- Polesie – "covered by forests"
- Pomerania – "along the sea"
- Silesia – from the holy Silesian mountain of Ślęża, which in turn derives its name from the nearby river Ślęza.
- Subcarpathia – "at the foot of the Carpathians"
- Warmia – from the Old Prussian tribe of Varms

== Portugal ==
- Alentejo: meaning "beyond the Tejo (the Tagus river)"
- Algarve: meaning "the west" (of the Guadiana River), from the Arab "Al-Gharb"
- Azores: from Açores (pl.), after the "açor", the Portuguese word for the northern goshawk
- Beira: quite literally, the "edge" (during the early phase of Portugal's history, Beira formed a borderland)
- Estremadura: from Medieval Latin Extrema Dorii (literally, "extremes of the Douro river"), referring to the territories south of the Douro basin (See also Spanish Extremadura)
- Madeira: "wood"
- Minho: after the river Minho, that passes north of the region
- Ribatejo: meaning "above the Tejo (the Tagus river)"
- Trás-os-Montes: literally, "behind the mountains", its territory is behind the mountains of Serra do Marão

== Romania ==
- Bessarabia – from Basarab I, Wallachian prince who led some expeditions in this land
- Bukovina – (from Serbian Bukovina in German: "Buchenland") = "beech land"
- Dobruja – from Dobrotitsa, ruler of the region in the 14th century
- Hațeg – "Terra Herzog"=Duke's land
- Muntenia – from muntean=man of the mountains, from Romanian munte=mountain
- Oltenia – from the river Olt, called Alutus by the Romans, possibly from Latin lutum, meaning "mud" or "clay".
- Transylvania – "beyond the woods"—i.e., from Hungary
  - Ardeal – possibly a borrowing of the Hungarian name Erdély, like the Romani name Ardyalo—speakers of old Hungarian pronounced Erdély as Erdél. The initial Hungarian "e-" occasionally changes to "a-" in Romanian (compare Hungarian egres "gooseberry" and Egyed, which became agriş and Adjud in Romanian). The ending '-eal' in Romanian does not suggest a Romanian borrowing from Hungarian. In parallel examples, Hungarian -ely becomes -ei in Romanian. But when Hungarian adopts a word from Romanian, "a" usually becomes "e": Andreas becomes Endre, the Latin ager becomes eger, etc. Thus the word Ardeal could become Erdély. The linguist Josep Lad Pic determined that the word "Ardeal" has an Indo-European origin, while the words Erdely and Erdo do not. The Proto-Indo-European root *arde ("to grow", "high") manifests itself in the Old Indian árdhuka ("prospering"), and in Latin arduus ("high"). In Celtic Gaul, Arduenna silva parallels the English "Forest of Arden" and the Ardennes Woods in Belgium. In Romanian, deal means "hill" and ardica "to grow, high, prosperous".
- Wallachia – "land of the Romance-speaking people"

== Russia ==
- Arkhangelsk Oblast: the region of the city of Arkhangelsk, whose name the inhabitants traditionally associated with a monastery in the area dedicated to the Archangel Michael (Russian: Архангел Михаил or Arkhangel Mikhail).
- Chechnya: the Russian ethnonym Chechen probably derives from the name of the ancient village of Chechana or Chechen-aul. The village stands on the bank of the Argun River, near Grozny. Another theory derives the name from chechenit' sya, "to talk mincingly". Vasmer suggests a Kabardian origin: šešen. The native term, Noxçi, comes from nexça (sheep cheese), nox (plow) or from the prophet Noah (Nox in Chechen).
- Dagestan: the word Daghestan or Daghistan (Avar: Дагъистан; Arabic and Persian: داغستان) means "country of mountains"; it derives from the Turkic word dağ, meaning "mountain" and the Persian suffix -stan meaning "land of". The spelling Dagestan transliterates the Russian name, which lacks the voiced velar fricative.
- Kaliningrad Oblast: from the Russian name Kaliningrad (Kalinin-city) of its largest city, renamed in 1946 to commemnorate Mikhail Kalinin
- Kazan (former Imperial Russian governorate): (compare the name of the city of Kazan)
- Khabarovsk Krai: the Khabarovsk region. The city of Khabarovsk took its name from the explorer Yerofey Khabarov
- Leningrad Oblast: from the city (Saint Petersburg) formerly known as Leningrad (Russian for Lenin-city)
- Nizhniy Novgorod: Russian: literally "lower Novgorod": for "lower new city", "new city on the Lower Volga"; in contrast to the older Novgorod
- Novaya Zemlya: Russian for "new land"
- Sakhalin: derived from misinterpretation of a Manchu name "sahaliyan ula angga hada" (peak of the mouth of the Amur River). "Sahaliyan" means "black" in Manchu and refers to the Amur River ( sahaliyan ula).
- Siberia: from a Tatar word meaning "sleeping land"
- Smolensk Oblast: from the river Smolnya
- Vladikavkaz: Russian for "ruler of the Caucasus" or "rule the Caucasus"

== Slovakia ==
- Banská Bystrica: The name includes two distinct roots: the adjective Banská (from Slovak baňa—"mine") and the name of the local river Bystrica (from Slavic bystrica—"a swift stream"). Its name in Hungarian: Besztercebánya has the same semantic origin. The name literally means "mining creek".
- Bratislava: The first written reference comes from the Annales Iuvavenses, which calls the locality Brezalauspurc (literally: Braslav's castle), in relation to the battles between the Bavaria and Hungary, which took place before the walls of Bratislava Castle in 907. The castle got its name either from Predslav, third son of King Svatopluk I or from the local noble Braslav. This former variant reappears as "Braslav" or "Preslava" on coins minted by King István I of Hungary, dating to about the year 1000 and in which appeared the motto "Preslavva Civitas". At the end of the Middle Ages, the name took its final German form Pressburg: Slovak of Prešporok derived from this. Although Pressburg remained the official name until 1919, the Hungarians use and used the name Pozsony (attested by the 12th century). Bozan could result from a ruling of the Bratislava Castle from the eleventh century. The name Posonium Latin derives from Hungarian. In addition to these names, documents of the Renaissance call the city 'Ιστροπόλις' Istropolis which means "City of the Danube" in Ancient Greek. The current name, Bratislava, dates from 1837 when the Slavist scholar Pavel Jozef Šafárik reconstructed a variant of the name, Břetislaw a from old names, believing that these derived from the name of the ruler Bretislaus I of Bohemia.
- Košice: The first written mention of the city as "villa Cassa" dates from 1230. The Slovak name of the city comes from the Slavic personal name "Koša" with the patronymic slavic suffix "-ice". According to other sources the city name probably stems from an ancient Hungarian first name which begins with "Ko" such as Kokos-Kakas, Kolumbán-Kálmán, or Kopov-Kopó. Historically, the city has been known as Kaschau in German, Kassa in Hungarian, Cassovia or Caschovia in Latin, Cassovie in French, Caşovia in Romanian, Кошицы (Koshitsy) in Russian and Koszyce in Polish (see here for more names).
- Nitra: The first mention of Nitra dates back to 880 (other variations: 826 as Nitrawa, 880 as Nitra, and in 1111/1113 as Nitra, Nitria). The name of the city derives from the river Nitra. The name originates in the Germanic word Nitrahwa: in the Indo-European languages nid means "flow" while ahwa means "water".
- Prešov: The city name originates in the Hungarian word eper which means "strawberry". The city's historic coat of arms contains strawberries. Historically, the city has been known as Eperjes in Hungarian, Eperies or Preschau in German, Fragopolis in Greco-Latin, Preszów in Polish, Peryeshis in Romany, Пряшев (Pryashev) in Russian and Пряшів (Priashiv) in Rusyn and Ukrainian.
- Trenčín: Trenčín first appeared under Greek name Leukaristos (Λευκαριστος), depicted on the Ptolemy world map around 150 CE. In 179 CE, during the Marcomannic Wars between the Roman Empire and Germanic Quadi, the Romans carved an inscription on the rock under the present-day castle, mentioning the place as Laugaricio. (The inscription marks the northernmost known presence of the Romans in Central Europe.) The first written mentions in the Middle Ages date from 1111 (as Treinchen) and from 1113 (adjective: Trenciniensis). The name became Trentschin in later German and Trencsén in Hungarian.
- Trnava: The name of the city derives from the Slovak word tŕnie ("thornbush") which characterized the river banks in the region. The Hungarian name Nagyszombat (first mentioned in 1238 in the form of Zumbotel) originates from the Hungarian word szombat ("Saturday"), referring to the weekly market fairs held on Saturdays.
- Žilina

== South Africa ==
=== Before 1994 ===
Map of the provinces of South Africa before 1994

- Transvaal: literally beyond the Vaal River, which acted as its southern border.
- Natal: see below at KwaZulu-Natal.
- Orange Free State: the Free State operated as an independent country (Free State) during most of the 19th century. The adjective Orange came from the Orange River to the south/south-west of the province, in turn named in 1779 by Robert Jacob Gordon (1743–1795), commander of the Cape Colony garrison (1780–1795), in honour of the Dutch House of Orange-Nassau.
- Cape of Good Hope: named after the Cape of Good Hope, where Cape Town stands.

=== After 1994 ===
Current map of South African provinces

- Eastern Cape, Northern Cape, Western Cape: from the Cape of Good Hope, the site of the first European settlement in today's South Africa, which would give its name to Cape Town, Cape Colony, and the former Cape Province, of which each of the three named provinces originally formed a part.
- Free State: the popular contraction of this province's historic predecessor, the Orange Free State.
- Gauteng: The Sesotho name for the province's and country's largest city of Johannesburg. The literal meaning, "Place of Gold", refers to the area's large gold-mining industry.
- KwaZulu-Natal: a combination of the names of the two entities that merged to form the modern province:
  - KwaZulu: a bantustan formed in the apartheid era, ostensibly as a "homeland" for the Zulu
  - Natal: Portuguese for "Christmas". The Portuguese explorer Vasco da Gama named the area: he landed on the coast of the future KwaZulu-Natal on Christmas Day in 1497.
- Limpopo: the Limpopo River forms the province's and the country's most northern boundary.
- Mpumalanga: "east", or more literally, "the place where the sun rises", in several Nguni languages, among them Swazi, Xhosa, and Zulu. Refers to the province's location in the north-east of South Africa.
- North West: From its geographic position, in the north of the country and west of the main population-centre of Gauteng.

== Spain ==
- Andalusia: from the Arabic name (Al-Andalus, with several suggested etymologies) formerly applied to the whole Iberian Peninsula
- Aragon: from the Aragon River, that gave its name to the county of Aragon, one of the little Christian polities that resisted Islamic rule in Spain during its greatest extent (see Reconquista)
- Asturias: the land of the Astures, an early people of north-west Spain
- Basque Country (Basque: Euskal Herria): from the ancient tribe of the Vascones, whose name became an ethnonym in the Middle Ages. The Basque name derives from Euskara (the autochthonous name for the Basque language).
  - Álava (Basque: Araba): of uncertain etymology. Various theories see it deriving from a Roman town called Alba, from several prossible Basque etymologies or from Arabs (who only briefly held the province). A chronicle of 905 uses the form Arba, but later the word commonly appears as Alaba or Alava.
  - Biscay (Basque: Bizkaia, Spanish: Vizcaya): variant of bizkarra ("shoulder", "back" or, in this case, "mountain range" in Basque)
  - Gipuzkoa (Spanish: Guipúzcoa): of unknown etymology. Old documents sometimes use the variant Ipuscoa.
- Cantabria: from the Cantabri, a mountain people defeated by the Romans only after a great military effort (Cantabrian Wars, 29 – 19 BC). Celtologists have suggested a derivation from the Celtic root cant-, meaning "rock" or "stone", and from the suffix -abr, used frequently in Celtic regions. From this we can deduce that the word "cantabrus" means "dwelling in the mountains", referring to the rugged terrain of Cantabria. Another suggestion derives Cantabria from the Celtic Kant ("mountain" or "rock") and Iber (the river Ebro), thus "The Mountains of the Ebro". Spaniards also call this region La Montaña ("The Mountain"), but usually call the Bay of Biscay the Cantabrian Sea.
- Castile: the Spanish/Castilian name Castilla reflects the Spanish castillo ("castle") and the Latin castellum ("fort" or "fortress") with reference to numerous forts or castles erected by King Alfonso I for the defence of the area
- Catalonia: from the castlà ("castellan") class who governed the nascent feudal Catalonia from their castles in the 11th and 12th centuries. (Compare the etymology of "Castile".) Other parallel theories exist: Lafont (1986) says Catalunya could come from Arabic Qalat-uniyya (Qalat means "castle" and -uniyya operates as a collective suffix) because medieval Catalonia formed a border country with a lot of castles in front of the Muslim and Arabized zone of the Iberic peninsula. Some texts suggest that the name Catalunya derives from "Gauta-landia": land of the Goths, or "Goth-Alania" meaning "Land of the Goths and Alans" through Arabian *Cotelanuyya [cf. Andalusia, land of the Vandals], as the Visigoths and Alans invaded and divided Iberia between themselves, agreeing to rule some parts together, with the region of Catalunya going to the Visigoths. Additionally, the Visigothic kingdom of Catalonia may have taken its name from that of the original homeland of the Visigoths, "Gotland". Coromines suggests an Iberian origin: Laietani (latinization of Iberian laiezken) > *laketani > laketans > metathesized as catelans > catalans, re-inforced by castellani (with an epenthetic s according to Coromines). Another theory suggests *kaste-lan as the Iberian name, later Latinized as castellani (an Iberian tribe in northern Catalonia according to Ptolemy); then the name would have evolved into *catellani > *catelans > *Catalans.
- Extremadura: from Medieval Latin Extrema Dorii (literally, "extremes of the Douro river"), referring to the territories south of the Douro basin; or from an Old Castilian word used to designate the further territories controlled by the Christians (see Reconquista)
- Galicia: from Latin Gallaecia, the name of the province created in Roman Hispania by Diocletian in 298 CE. It derives from gallicoi or callicoi, (Galli or Celts).
- León: the ancient kingdom and subsequent province of León take their name from the city of León, whose name derives from its position as the base of a Roman legion (Latin legio)
- Navarre (Spanish: Navarra, Basque: Nafarroa): from the Kingdom of Navarre. Navarra has been argued to have either a Basque or Romance etymology. In the first case it would come from nabar ("brownish, multicolor", also "plowshare"), in the second from nava ("river bank").
- Rioja: speculatively interpreted as "red" from the redness of a prominent soil type in the area.

== Sweden ==
=== Historical Provinces ===
Provinces of Sweden

Sweden formerly consisted of historical provinces (Swedish: landskap), and the province-names still often serve to describe locations in Sweden. Their names often date from before the year 1000. Officially Sweden now subdivides into counties (Swedish: län), introduced in 1634.

Historical provinces:

- Blekinge: from the adjective bleke, which corresponds to the nautical term for "dead calm".
- Bohuslän: meaning "county of Bohus Fortress".
- Dalarna: meaning "the valleys"
- Dalsland: originally Dal, meaning "the valley"
- Gotland: land of the Gutar
- Gästrikland
- Halland: the land beyond Hovs Hallar
- Hälsingland
- Härjedalen: valley of the Härje river
- Jämtland
- Lappland: land of the Lappi (the Sami people)
- Medelpad: Unclear. "Medel" means "in the middle". One theory is "the land between the river valleys" (Ljungan and Indalsälven)
- Norrbotten: from Norrbotten County
- Närke
- Skåne
- Småland: "small lands", given for a combination of several smaller provinces.
- Södermanland: "south men's land"
- Uppland "up land" (north of Stockholm, used after the foundation of Stockholm, was before that three independent provinces)
- Värmland
- Västmanland: "west men's land"
- Västerbotten: West Bothnia (west side of the Gulf of Bothnia). In old Nordic "botten" meant inner part of a bay/gulf, see the etymology of Bothnia. Compare Ostrobothnia (Österbotten / East Bothnia) in Finland, formerly a Swedish province, and Norrbotten above.
- Västergötland: means Western Gothia/Götaland.
- Ångermanland: from the Old Norse "anger", which means "deep fjord" and refers to the deep mouth of the river Ångermanälven.
- Öland
- Östergötland: means Eastern Gothia/Götaland

=== Present counties ===
- Stockholm: from Stockholm, the city. From stock (timber log) and holm (small island). (Somewhat disputed.)
- Uppsala: from Uppsala, the city. (Ultimate etymology disputed.)
- Jönköping: from Jönköping, the city. Jön comes from the creek Junebäcken; "köping" means "merchant place".
- Kronoberg: from Kronoberg Castle. Kronoberg means "the Crown's mountain".
- Kalmar: from Kalmar, the city. (Ultimate etymology disputed.)
- Västra Götaland: means "Western Gothia/Götaland".
- Örebro: from Örebro, the city, the name of which means "bridge over gravel banks".
- Gävleborg: from Gävle, the city, and borg (fortress), referring to Gävle Castle.
- Västernorrland: means "Western Norrland". At the time Norrland meant North Sweden including North Finland, and Western Norrland excluded Finland. Now Västernorrland is located in Eastern Norrland.
- Norrbotten: North Bothnia (originally northern part of Västerbotten County)
- Blekinge, Dalarna, Gotland, Halland, Jämtland, Skåne, Södermanland, Värmland, Västerbotten, Västmanland and Östergötland are named directly after the historical province they match. See previous chapter.

== Switzerland ==
- Aargau: German name labelling the district (Gau) of the River Aar.
- Appenzell: from Latin abbatis cella, meaning "land of the abbot", referring to the fact that Appenzell originally belonged to the Abbey of St. Gall.
- Basel: traditionally associated with the Greek basileus ("king") or basileos ("of the king"): the city saw itself as preserving the Imperial Roman heritage of its parent settlement, the Roman town of Augusta Raurica. Note the use of the basilisk as a Basler icon.
- Bern: German Bär[e]n (bears): reflected in the capital city's bear-pits, foundation-legend and coat-of-arms
- Graubünden: (the German name literally means "grey leagues")—from the Grey League, a grey-clad organisation started in 1395.
- Jura: after the Jura Mountains.
- Neuchâtel: French for "new castle"; Neuenburg (with the same semantic meaning) in German
- Schwyz: named after the town of Schwyz; the origin of the town name is unknown.
- St Gallen: from Saint Gall (c. 550 – c. 646), traditionally the Irish founder/namesake of the Abbey of St. Gall which came to dominate the area.
- Solothurn: the city of Solothurn, capital of the Canton of the same name, first appears under the Celtic name Salodurum.
- Thurgau: an early medieval Gau county named after the River Thur.
- Ticino: from the principal river of the canton, the Ticino, a tributary of the Po River.
- Uri: (speculatively) from the older German Aurochs, a wild ox (see aurochs); or from the Celtic word ure, a bull. (Note the head of the bull on the cantonal coat of arms.)
- Valais (French), Wallis (German): from the Latin word vallis, meaning "valley"; the canton consists mainly of the Rhone valley.
- Zürich: after the city of Zürich, called Turicum in 2nd-century Latin; the origin of the Latin name is unknown.

== Syria ==
- Latakia: Greek: Λαοδίκεια (Laodikeia)
- Idlib: Arabic: إدلب
- Aleppo: Khalpe, Khalibon
- Raqqa: Arabic: الرقة
- Al-Hasakah:
- Tartus: Greek: Antarados
- Hama: Hittite: Amatuwana
- Deir ez-zor: Arabic: دير الزور
- Homs: Greek: Ἔμεσα (Emesa)
- Damascus: "T-m-ś-q" (15th century BC)
- Rif Dimashq: Arabic: ريف دمشق
- Quneitra: Arabic: القنيطرة
- Daraa: Atharaa (hieroglyphic tablets)
- As-Suwayda: Arabic: السويداء

== Taiwan ==
- Changhua (彰化): "Manifest [Imperial] Influence" in Chinese (顯彰皇化) in 1723
- Chiayi (嘉義): "Commend Righteousness" in 1787
- Hsinchu (新竹): Literally "New Bamboo", renamed from "Bamboo Fortress" (Chinese: 竹塹, Mandarin: Zhuqian) in 1878
- Hualien (花蓮): Literally "Lotus Flower" in Chinese, shortened from Karenkō (Japanese: 花蓮港), renamed by 1920 from Kiray (奇萊), previously "Whirling Waves" (洄瀾; Huilan)
- Kaohsiung (高雄): literally "High Grandeur", from Japanese Takao, renamed in 1920 from Takau (Chinese: 打狗; pinyin: Dagou; Pe̍h-ōe-jī: Táⁿ-káu), "Bamboo Forest" in a Formosan language
- Keelung (基隆): Literally "Prosperous Base" in Chinese, renamed in 1875 from "Chicken Cage" (Chinese: 雞籠; Mandarin: Jilong; Pe̍h-ōe-jī: Ke-lâng), possibly derived from the Ketagalan people
- Kinmen (金門): "Golden Gate", 1387. When a fortress was built to defend the coast of Fujian, Kinmen was described as being "as secure as a metal moat, proudly safeguarding the gate of the sea" (固若金湯, 雄鎮海門)
- Miaoli (苗栗): Renamed in 1889 from 貓狸/貓里 (Mandarin: Maoli), from the Bari Settlement of the Taokas Tribe, meaning "Plains"
- Nantou (南投): 1695, after the Ramtau settlement of the Arikun Tribe
- Penghu (澎湖): "Splashing Lake" in Chinese, (formerly Chinese: 平湖; Pe̍h-ōe-jī: Pîⁿ-ô͘)
- Pingtung (屏東): East of Banpingshan (literally "Half-Screen Mountain"), from Japanese Heitō (屏東) in 1920
- Tainan (臺南): 1887 creation of Tainan Prefecture, "Southern Taiwan [City]" in Chinese
- Taipei (臺北): "Northern Taiwan [City]" in Chinese, 1875 creation of Taipeh Prefecture
- Taichung (臺中): "Central Taiwan [City]" in Chinese, from Japanese Taichū-ken (臺中縣) created 1896
- Taitung (臺東): "Eastern Taiwan [City]" in Chinese. Creation of Taitung Prefecture in 1888
- Taoyuan (桃園): "Peach Orchard" in Chinese, officially Tōen Chō (桃園廳), 1909
- Yilan (宜蘭): Literally "Suitable Orchid" in Chinese, 1878 creation of Gilan Hsien, derived from the Kavalan people
- Yunlin (雲林): Literally "Clouded Woods" in Chinese, created in 1887

== Thailand ==
- Bangkok – Thai: place of olives
- Bueng Kan – Thai: black lake
- Chiang Mai – Northern Thai: new city
- Chonburi – Thai: city of water, as the city is very close to the sea
- Kanchanaburi – Thai: golden city
- Kalasin – Thai: black water
- Narathiwat – Malay: Menara (tower)
- Nonthaburi – Thai: city of Peltophorum pterocarpum (Nontri), the provincial tree of Nonthaburi
- Pattani – Malay: pata ini (this beach)
- Pattaya – from thap phraya, which means army of the Phraya
- Phitsanulok – Thai: Vishnu's heaven
- Phuket – Malay: bukit (hill)
- Roi Et – Thai: one hundred and one (101)
- Udon Thani – Thai: northern city
- Yasothon – named after Yasodhara

== Ukraine ==
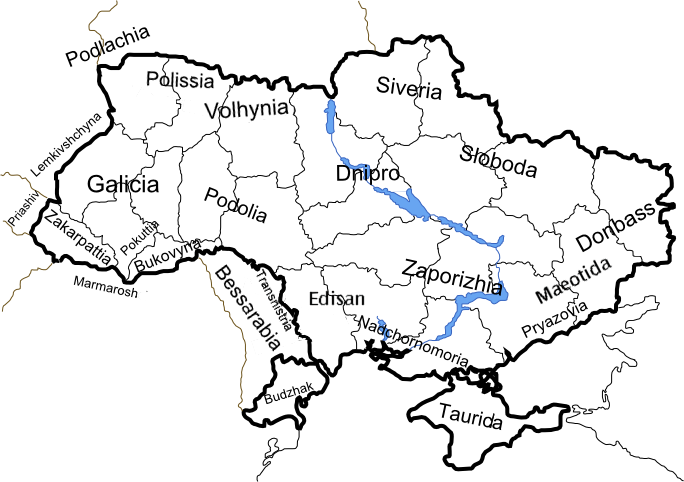
Traditional regions

Most of Ukraine's oblasts take their names from their principal city; but Volyn Oblast, Zakarpattia Oblast, the Crimean Autonomous Republic, and since 2016, Dnipropetrovsk and Kirovohrad oblasts, offer exceptions to this rule. See also subdivisions of Ukraine.

- Cherkasy Oblast: from the city Cherkasy, presumably the city's name derived from Circassians according to Giovanni da Pian del Carpine, Vasiliy Tatishchev, and Aleksandr Rigelman.
- Chernihiv Oblast: from the city Chernihiv
- Chernivtsi Oblast: from the city Chernivtsi
- Crimea: from the Crimean Tatar name: Qırım
- Dnipropetrovsk Oblast: from the city Dnipropetrovsk (renamed in 1926 after Dnipro (Dnieper river) and the Soviet Ukraine 's head of state, the Bolshevik Grigory Ivanovich Petrovsky, in 2016 renamed Dnipro)
- Donetsk Oblast: from the city Donetsk, after the Donets river. Donets is a diminutive form of Don and is a tributary of the river Don.
- Ivano-Frankivsk Oblast: from the city Ivano-Frankivsk, renamed (from Stanyslaviv) after the Ukrainian writer Ivan Franko (1856–1916) in 1962
- Kharkiv Oblast: from the city Kharkiv, legendarily named for the mythical Ukrainian folk hero Kharko (died ca 1737)
- Kherson Oblast: from the city Kherson
- Khmelnytskyi Oblast: from the city Khmelnytskyi, named in 1954 on the 300th anniversary of the Treaty of Pereyaslav, after Cossack leader Bohdan Khmelnytsky
- City of Kyiv: ancient name (Ukrainian: Kyiv). Myth/legend tells of a founder named Kyi
- Kyiv Oblast: from the city Kyiv
- Kirovohrad Oblast: from the city Kirovohrad ("Kirov City"), after Sergey Kirov (named Kirovo in 1934, Kirovohrad in 1939, in 2016 renamed Kropyvnytskyi)
- Luhansk Oblast: from the city Luhansk
- Lviv Oblast: from the city of Lviv, founded 1256 by King Danylo of Halych, and named after his son Lev Danylovich
- Mykolaiv Oblast: from the city Mykolaiv, after the day of Saint Nicholas (Ukrainian Mykolai, Russian Nikolai), 19 December 1788, commemorating the fall of the Turkish fortress of Ochakiv to the Russians
- Odesa Oblast: after the city Odesa in 1795; etymology unknown, but see Odesa: "History" for some possibilities
- Poltava Oblast: from Ltava, an ancient name of the city Poltava
- Rivne Oblast: from the city Rivne
- City of Sevastopol: (1783) Greek "highly respectable city, august city"; see Sevastopol: "Etymology"
- Sumy Oblast: from the city Sumy
- Ternopil Oblast: from the city Ternopil
- Vinnytsia Oblast: from the city Vinnytsia
- Volyn Oblast: ancient name of the region of Volyn
- Zakarpattia Oblast: "beyond the Carpathian Mountains", Transcarpathia
- Zaporizhzhia Oblast: from the city Zaporizhzhia, in turn after region "beyond the rapids" (seventeenth century), downstream of the rapids of the River Dnieper
- Zhytomyr Oblast: from the city Zhytomyr (988), after Zhytomyr, prince of the Drevlians

== United Kingdom ==
=== Constituent countries ===
- England: "Land of the Angles", from Old English Englaland, for the Germanic tribe first attested in 897. The Angles themselves were first attested as the Latin Anglii in Tacitus's 1st-century Germania and the name was extended to cover the other Germans in Britain after the ascension of the Kentish Egbert to the Saxon thrones. Their etymology is uncertain: possible derivations include Angul (the Angeln peninsula of eastern Jutland), the "people of the Narrow [Water]" (from the proposed proto-Indo-European root *ang-, "narrow", or *angh-, "tight") in reference to the Angeln's Schlei inlet, "people of the meadows" (cf. Old High German angar), the god *Ingwaz – a proposed Proto-Germanic form of Freyr's earlier name Yngvi, – or the Ingaevones who claimed their descent from him. See Etymology of England.
  - Anglia, a former name: As above, in its Latin form.
  - Angelcynn, a former name: "Folk of the Angles", from Old English, name used by Alfred the Great.
- Northern Ireland: Northern part of the island of Ireland; see List of country-name etymologies: Ireland for the etymology of the name "Ireland".
- Scotland: "Land of the Scots", attested in the 11th-century Anglo-Saxon Chronicles of Abingdon, Worcester and Laud. "Scot" from Old English Scottas, from Late Latin Scoti or Scotti, of ultimately uncertain origin, but used in Latin to reference Gaels raiding Roman Britain from a region (Scotia) in Ireland. and whose colinguists established the realm of Dál Riata in the vicinity of Argyll.
  - Alba, Albania, or Albany, former endonyms: Uncertain etymology, presumed to derive from Albion or its antecedents. See also "Albion" at List of country-name etymologies: United Kingdom.
  - Caledonia, a former name: "Land of the Caledonii" in Latin, from a Latin name for a local tribe, of uncertain etymology. Possibly related to the Welsh caled ("hard", "tough").
- Wales: From Proto-Germanic word Walhaz, meaning "Romanised foreigner"; through Old English wǣlisċ, meaning "foreigner", with the more specific Brettwǣlisċ referring directly to Brittonic speaking people (literally "British Welsh/Foreigners"); to Modern English Welsh. The Anglo-Saxon Chronicle (British Library MS. Cotton Tiberius B) glosses Bede's Ecclesiastical History, citing Brettwǣlisċ as one of the fīf ġeþēodu, or "five languages", of the island of Brytene, along with the Englisċ, Scottisċ, Pihttisċ, and Bōclǣden (English, Scottish, Pictish, and Latin). The same etymology applies to Cornwall in Britain and to Wallonia in Belgium. See Etymology of Wales.
  - Brythoniaiad, a former name: "Britons" in Old Welsh. See "Britain" under List of country-name etymologies: United Kingdom. More inclusive than "Cymru", its use predominated until around the 12th century.
  - Cambria: Latinized version of Cymru below. Geoffrey of Monmouth related the traditional pseudoetymology of this name from an eponymous King Camber.
  - Cymru (endonym): "Land of Compatriots" from Old Welsh kymry ("compatriots"), first attested in an encomium to Cadwallon ap Cadfan c. 633, from Brythonic combrogi. Its use during the post-Roman era amounted to a self-perception that the Welsh and the "Men of the North" were one people, distinguished from the invaders, Cornishmen and Bretons.

=== British Crown Dependencies ===
- Jersey: The Norse suffix -ey means "island" and is commonly found in the parts of Northern Europe where Norsemen established settlements. (Compare modern Nordic languages: øy in Norwegian, ø/ö in Danish and Swedish.) The meaning of the first part of the island's name is unclear. Among theories are that it derives from Norse jarth ("earth") or jarl ("earl"), or perhaps a personal name, Geirr, to give "Geirr's Island". American writer William Safire suggested that the "Jers" in Jersey could be a corruption of "Caesar".
- Isle of Man: The island's name in both English and Manx (Mannin) derives from Manannán mac Lir, the Brythonic and Gaelic, equivalent to the god Poseidon.

=== British Overseas Territories ===
- Anguilla: "eel", for its elongated shape, from either Spanish anguila, Italian anguilla, or French anguille, as it is uncertain whether the island was first sighted by Christopher Columbus in 1493 or by French explorers in 1564.
- Bermuda: "Land of Bermúdez", from the Spanish La Bermuda, from the Spanish captain Juan de Bermúdez who sighted the island in 1505 while returning from Hispaniola.
- British Indian Ocean Territory (BIOT): See List of country-name etymologies for etymologies of Britain and India
- British Virgin Islands: bestowed by Christopher Columbus from Saint Ursula and her 11,000 virgins, on account of the seemingless endless number of islands
- Cayman Islands: From the Spanish name Caymanas, from the Carib for "caiman", a kind of marine alligator.
- Falkland Islands: From the Falkland Sound between the two main islands, bestowed by English captain John Strong in 1690 in honor of Anthony Cary, 5th Viscount Falkland, First Lord of the Admiralty. Falkland Palace was the Caries' ancestral home in Scotland.
  - Islas Malvinas, its Spanish name: "Malovian Islands", from the French Malouines describing the Breton sailors from St. Malo in Brittany who frequented the islands in the 1690s.
  - Sebald Islands, a former name now applied in Spanish to the Jason Islands: From a Dutch name commemorating Sebald de Weert, the captain usually credited with first sighting the archipelago in 1598.
- Gibraltar: A corruption of the Arabic words Jebel Tariq (جبل طارق) which means "Tariq's Mountain", named after Tariq ibn Ziyad, a Berber who landed at Gibraltar in 711 to launch the Islamic invasion of the Iberian Peninsula.
- Montserrat: From the Spanish name Santa Maria de Monterrate bestowed by Christopher Columbus in 1493 in honor of the Blessed Virgin of the Monastery of Montserrate in Spain. "Montserrat" itself means "jagged mountain".
- Pitcairn Islands: A member of the English Captain Philip Carteret's crew in his ship HMS Swallow first sighted the remote islands in July 1767. Carteret named the main island "Pitcairn's Island" after the man who first saw land: the son of Major Pitcairn of the Marines.
- Saint Helena, Ascension and Tristan da Cunha:
  - Saint Helena: bestowed by Portuguese explorer João da Nova in honor of Saint Helena, the mother of Roman emperor Constantine the Great, for its discovery on Saint Helena's Day, 21 May 1502.
- South Georgia and the South Sandwich Islands (SGSSI):
  - South Georgia: "Land of George", from the original "Isle of Georgia" bestowed by British captain James Cook in honor of King George III on 17 January 1775. "South" distinguished it from the other colony of Georgia, which became an American state in 1782.
  - South Sandwich Islands: Bestowed by British captain James Cook in honor of John Montagu, Earl of Sandwich, who at the time was First Lord of the Admiralty and helped fund Cook's voyages. "South" distinguished them from the other Sandwich Islands, now known by their native name Hawaii.
- Turks and Caicos Islands (TCI):
  - Turks Islands: for the indigenous Turk's-cap cacti (Melocactus communis)
  - Caicos Islands: from the indigenous Lucayan caya hico, meaning "string of islands".

== United States ==
=== Territories ===
- Baker Island National Wildlife Refuge, an unincorporated territory: for American captain Michael Baker of New Bedford, Massachusetts, who claimed to have discovered it in 1832 or 1834, despite being the third to have done so.
- Guam, a territory: From the native Chamorro word guahan, meaning "we have".
- Howland Island, a territory: Bestowed by Capt. George E. Netcher in honor of the lookout who sighted it from his ship, the Isabella, on 9 September 1842.
- Jarvis Island, a territory: Bestowed by the British Captain Brown in honor of Edward, Thomas, and William Jarvis, the owners of his vessel the Eliza Francis.
- Johnston Atoll, a territory: For British captain Charles J. Johnston, commander of HMS Cornwallis, who discovered the atoll on 14 December 1807.
- Kingman Reef, a territory: For Capt. W.E. Kingman, who discovered the reef aboard the Shooting Star on 29 November 1853.
- Midway Islands, a territory: For their geographic location, perhaps from the islands' situation midway between North America and Asia, or their proximity to the International Date Line (halfway around the world from the Greenwich Meridian).
  - Middlebrook Islands or the Brook Islands, former names: For their discoverer, Captain N.C. Middlebrooks.
- Navassa Island, a territory: From the Spanish Navaza (nava- meaning "plain" or "field"), bestowed by members of Christopher Columbus's crew who discovered the island while attempting to return to Hispaniola from Jamaica
- Northern Mariana Islands, a commonwealth: From its position and the Spanish name Las Marianas bestowed by the Jesuit missionary San Vitores in 1668 in honour of Mariana of Austria, widow of King Felipe IV and regent of Spain.
- Palmyra Atoll, a territory: Named after the boat Palmyra, which belonged to the American Captain Sawle. He sought shelter on the atoll on 7 November 1802, and became the first person known to land on it.
- Puerto Rico, a territory with commonwealth status: Christopher Columbus named the island San Juan Bautista in honour of Saint John the Baptist in 1493. The Spanish authorities set up a capital city called Puerto Rico (meaning "rich port"). For now unknown reasons, the island and capital city had exchanged names by the 1520s.
- United States Virgin Islands, an insular area: See British Virgin Islands above.
- Wake Island, an unincorporated territory: for British Captain William Wake, who sighted the island in 1796, despite the Spanish explorer Mendaña having probably sighted it in 1568.

== Venezuela ==
- Amazonas: for the Amazon rainforest.
- Anzoátegui: in honor of independence hero José Antonio Anzoátegui.
- Apure: for the Apure River.
- Aragua: derived from the Cumanagota word for a type of palm, Roystonea oleracea.
- Barinas: comes from an indigenous word which identifies a strong wind that occurs during the rainy season, from the valleys of Santo Domingo.
- Bolívar: in honor of independence hero Simón Bolívar.
- Carabobo: comes from the Arawak karau (savannah; plain) and bo (water). The repeated bo acts as a superlative.
- Cojedes (state): for the Cojedes River.
- Delta Amacuro: for the Orinoco Delta and the Amacuro River.
- Falcón: in honor of president Juan Crisóstomo Falcón.
- Guárico: Carib word for "chief".
- Lara: in honor of independence hero Jacinto Lara.
- Mérida: after the city of Mérida in Extremadura, Spain.
- Miranda: in honor of independence hero Francisco de Miranda.
- Monagas: in honor of president José Tadeo Monagas and the Monagas family.
- Nueva Esparta: after Sparta.
- Portuguesa: after Portugal.
- Sucre: in honor of independence hero Antonio José de Sucre.
- Táchira: from the Timoto–Cuica word tachure which was used to designate the bellyache bush (Jatropha gossypiifolia).
- Trujillo: after the city of Trujillo in Extremadura, Spain.
- Vargas: in honor of president José María Vargas.
- Yaracuy: in honor of a local cacique.
- Zulia: in honor of a mythological Wayuu princess.

== See also ==
- Etymology
- Toponymy
- List of country name etymologies
- List of political entities named after people
- Lists of etymologies
- List of double placenames
