= Gwalia =

Poetic name for Wales; considered archaic

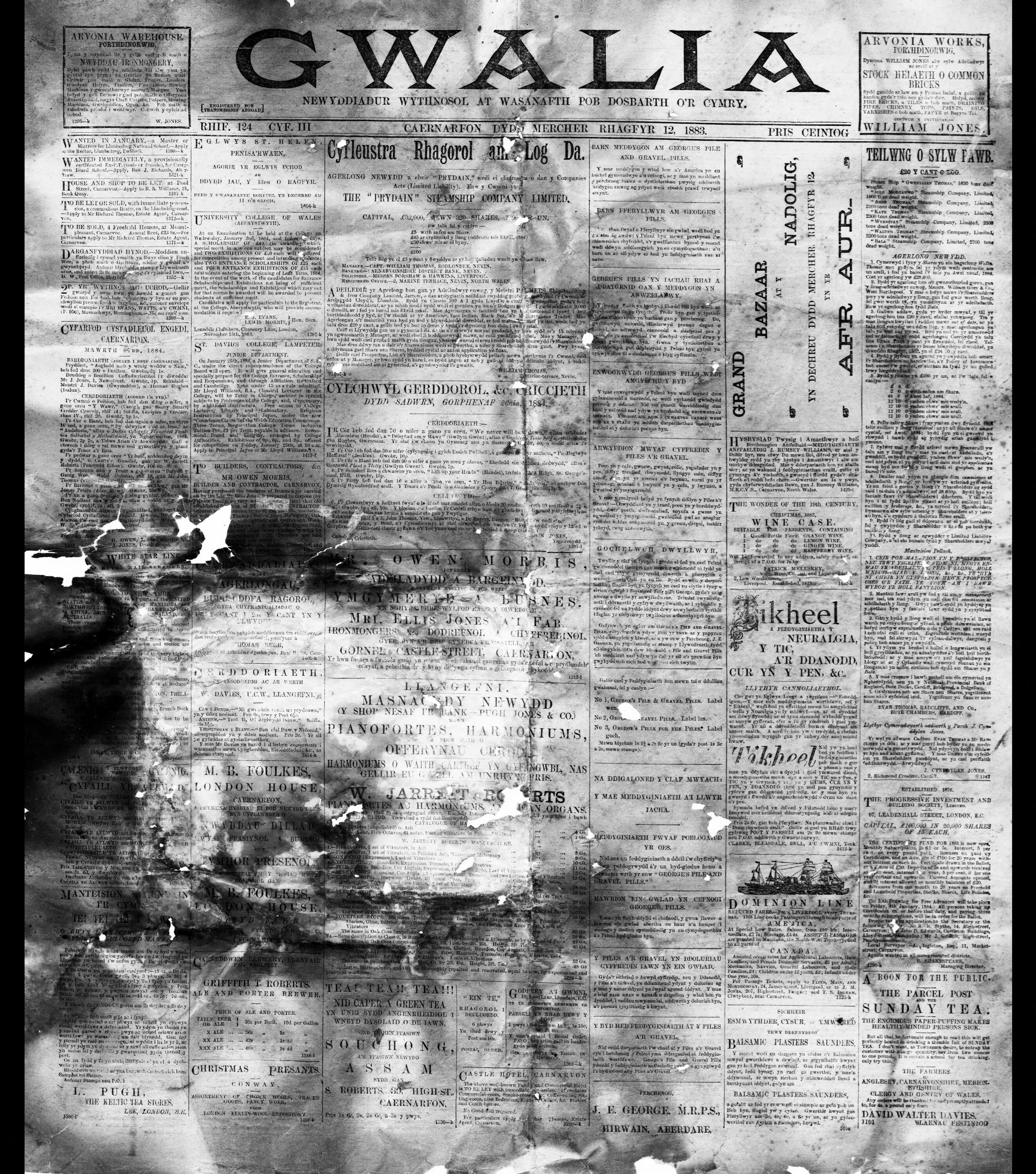
Front page of the earliest surviving copy of the Welsh newspaper Gwalia

Gwalia is an archaic Welsh name for Wales. It derives from the Medieval Latin Wallia, which in turn is a Latinisation of the Old English 'Walh' or 'Wealh', which the name 'Wales' is also derived from. Although never as widely used as Cymru, Gwalia was once popular as a poetic name for the country, akin to Albion.

The name originated in the Middle Ages and there are several instances of it in Late Medieval Welsh poetry. Possibly the best-known is in "Yr Awdl Fraith", a long poem or awdl attributed to Taliesin, and one of the most popular of the period. It imagines gwyllt Walia (Wild Gwalia) rising up against the Anglo-Saxon settlement of Britain.

In the 19th century, at the height of Romanticism, the name Gwalia once again became popular among local writers. It has now largely fallen out of use due to its Victorian associations.

Gwalia is also used in the choral piece "O Gymru" from 1971, music by Rhys Jones, lyrics by Leslie Harris and arrangement by Aled Lloyd Davies. The lyrics of a popular 2019 single by the name "Gwalia" from the Welsh language band Gwilym was inspired by "O Gymru". It won Best Video in Y Selar Awards 2020.

The name Gwalia was given to a gold-mining area of Western Australia after the origin of the man who financed a search for gold in the area.

== See also ==
- Cambria
- Etymology of Vlach
- Walha
