= List of double placenames =

Double placenames prominently feature the placenames of two or more constituents in double-barrelled form rather than invent a new name. This is often out of consideration for local sensitivities, since the smaller entity may resent its takeover, and may demand its symbolic perpetuation within an amalgamated name so as to propagate the impression of a merger between equals.

== Styles ==
In their English forms, the conjoined names may have the following patterns:

- concatenation, e.g. Papua New Guinea
- grammatical conjunction, e.g. Trinidad and Tobago

The punctuation and capitalization practices in written English vary:

- merging into one word without an intermediate space, e.g. Budapest
- standing apart, e.g. Papua New Guinea
- conjunction by hyphenation. While English-speakers are relaxed about using a hyphen or not, this punctuation once caused controversy between Czechs and Slovaks
- conjunction with an en dash, typically when the usage is associative, attributive or is a juxtaposition of two independent entities.
- CamelCase may sometimes be attempted, but many style guides recommend against this in formal English-language use.

Three-word names for two-part entities are often ambiguous. For example, it may not be clear whether North Rhine-Westphalia is an amalgamation between the north part of the Rhine Province on the one hand and Westphalia on the other (true) or the northern division of some pre-existing place called Rhine-Westphalia (false). While this problem does not arise in German, no entirely satisfactory punctuation of such names has been established in English. In the above case, the hyphen is often omitted because it is misleading. It has been proposed that this state's name be punctuated "North-Rhine/Westphalia" in English, but the solidus or forward slash is also ambiguous.

=== Neologisms ===
Some names have been merged and modified as an alternative to using hyphenation or grammatical conjunction:

- BosWash: the megalopolis extending from Boston to Washington, D.C., CamelCase example (extended in fiction into a Boston–Atlanta Metropolitan Axis or BAMA covering most of the US East Coast)
- SeaTac: another example of CamelCase (Seattle and Tacoma, Washington)
- Czechoslovakia: the Czech lands and Slovakia
- Senegambia: Senegal and Gambia
- Tanzania: Tanganyika and Zanzibar

=== False double placenames ===
Binomial placenames are not true double placenames, but elements in a hierarchical naming system. They are a means of distinguishing two entities which share a parent geographic feature. Examples:

- Guinea-Bissau (official name of the country with capital Bissau, as distinct from Guinea, with capital Conakry)
- Congo-Brazzaville and Congo-Kinshasa (from the respective capitals of what are officially Republic of the Congo and Democratic Republic of the Congo)

They are often used for railway stations and airports:

- King's Cross St Pancras, the London Underground station serving two separate London railway terminals: King's Cross and St Pancras railway stations.
- Paris - Orly Airport, one of two Paris airports
- Trenton–Mercer Airport, actually located in Ewing, outside Trenton, both in Mercer County.

Trenton–Mercer is an example of a marketing decision in which a small airport tries to associate itself with a larger city. Ryanair has been criticized for promoting names for airports unusually far from the city from which they are named, such as Paris Beauvais Tillé Airport (a triple name) and Frankfurt-Hahn Airport.

Binomial names may be seen in German-language texts to denominate parts of towns:

- Bergen-Belsen: the Belsen section within the municipality of Bergen. (This form is now fixed in English when referring to the Nazi concentration camp and the present memorial there.)
- Berlin-Charlottenburg: the district of Charlottenburg, Berlin

The word "and" in its name does not always signify the union of two distinct territories:

- Sala y Gómez: one island named for two people
- Lewis and Clark County, Montana: named for Meriwether Lewis and William Clark

In dual naming, words in two different languages have been joined by a hyphen or a slash to become the community's (or geographic feature's) official name, often because of language politics:

- Vitoria-Gasteiz: the combination of this city's Spanish name of Vitoria and Basque name of Gasteiz
- Dingle/Daingean Uí Chúis: proposed official name (combining English and Irish-language names) of a town in the County Kerry Gaeltacht.
- Aoraki / Mount Cook: mountain in New Zealand with Māori and English names combined. Many geographic features of New Zealand are officially designated in a similar way (and the country as a whole is sometimes unofficially referred to as "Aotearoa New Zealand").

Similarly, places may simply have an official name which consists of two names, such as the Australian territory of the Cocos (Keeling) Islands, which consists of the North Keeling Island and the South Keeling Islands.

=== Transitional names ===
Sometimes names will be concatenated during a name change. Zimbabwe Rhodesia was the name of the former Rhodesia and future Zimbabwe from June 1 to December 12, 1979.

== Sovereign states ==
- Antigua and Barbuda: Antigua and Barbuda
- Bosnia and Herzegovina: Bosnia and Herzegovina
- Papua New Guinea: Territories of Papua and New Guinea; Papua and New Guinea are actually alternate names of the same island, New Guinea, but have been used officially for different parts of this island
- São Tomé and Príncipe: São Tomé and Príncipe
- Saint Kitts and Nevis: Saint Kitts and Nevis
- Saint Vincent and the Grenadines: Saint Vincent and Grenadines
- Trinidad and Tobago: Trinidad and Tobago
- United Kingdom of Great Britain and Northern Ireland: Great Britain and Northern Ireland

== Non-sovereign entities ==
=== Dependent territories ===
- Andaman and Nicobar Islands: Andaman Islands and Nicobar Islands (India)
- Dadra and Nagar Haveli and Daman and Diu (India): Daman and Diu (Daman and Diu) and Dadra and Nagar Haveli (Dadra and Nagar Haveli)
- Ashmore and Cartier Islands: Ashmore Island and Cartier Island (Australia)
- Heard Island and McDonald Islands: Heard Island and McDonald Island (Australia)
- Saint Pierre and Miquelon: Saint Pierre Island and Miquelon (France)
- South Georgia and the South Sandwich Islands: South Georgia and South Sandwich Islands (United Kingdom)
- Sovereign Base Areas of Akrotiri and Dhekelia: Akrotiri and Dhekelia Cantonment (United Kingdom)
- Trindade and Martim Vaz: Trindade Island and Martim Vaz Island (Brazil)
- Saint Peter and Saint Paul: Saint Peter island and Saint Paul Island (Brazil)
- Turks and Caicos Islands: Turks and Caicos (United Kingdom)
- Wallis and Futuna Islands: Wallis Island and Futuna Islands (France)

=== Regions of states ===
- Arica y Parinacota Region: Arica and Parinacota (Chile)
- Emilia-Romagna: Emilia and Romagna (Italy)
- Friuli-Venezia Giulia: Friuli and Venezia Giulia (Italy)
- Trás-os-Montes e Alto Douro: Trás-os-Montes and Alto Douro (Portugal)
- Trentino-Alto Adige/Südtirol: Trentino and South Tyrol, formerly Alto Adige (Italy)

=== States of federations ===
- Baden-Württemberg: Baden and Württemberg (Germany)
- Mecklenburg-Vorpommern: Mecklenburg and Vorpommern (Germany)
- Newfoundland and Labrador: Newfoundland and Labrador (Canada)
- North Rhine-Westphalia: part of the Rhineland with Westphalia (Germany)
- Rhineland-Palatinate: part of the Rhineland with the Palatinate (Germany)
- Rhode Island and Providence Plantations: Rhode Island proper and Providence Plantations (United States)
  - The name of the state was officially shortened to "Rhode Island" in 2020.
- Saxony-Anhalt: part of Saxony with Anhalt (Germany)
- Schleswig-Holstein: Schleswig and Holstein (Germany)

Four regions of France, several federal subjects of Russia, most local government districts of Northern Ireland and some autonomous communities of Spain (Castile and León, Castile-La Mancha) also feature two or more placenames conjoined by a hyphen or with the word "and" (or its translation).

=== Provinces and counties ===
- Aetolia-Acarnania: Aetolia and Acarnania (Greece)
- Bà Rịa–Vũng Tàu province (Vietnam)
- Gothenburg and Bohus (historic): Gothenburg and Bohuslän (Sweden)
- Kuyavian-Pomeranian Voivodeship: Kuyavia and Pomerania (Poland)
- Møre og Romsdal: Møre and Romsdal (Norway)
- Newfoundland and Labrador (Canada)
- Ross and Cromarty (historic): Ross-shire and Cromartyshire (Scotland)
- Sogn og Fjordane (historic): Sogn and the fjords (Norway)
- Thừa Thiên–Huế Province (Vietnam)
- Warmian-Masurian Voivodeship: Warmia and Masuria (Poland)

=== Capital cities ===
- Budapest formed in 1873 by the amalgamation of three former capitals, Buda and Óbuda (Old Buda) on the right bank of the Danube, and Pest on the left bank.

=== Other cities and towns ===
- Bielsko-Biała, a Polish city, is composed of two former towns on opposite banks of the Biała River, Silesian Bielsko and Lesser Poland's Biała, merged in 1951, both deriving from "white" (biała) in Polish.
- Boguszów-Gorce, Polish town composed of two former towns of Boguszów and Gorce, merged in 1973
- Boldești-Scăeni, Romanian town composed of two former settlements of Boldești and Scăeni, merged in 1968
- Boulogne-Billancourt is the name of an industrial in the western suburbs of Paris, France. In 1924, the commune Boulogne-sur-Seine was officially renamed Boulogne-Billancourt to reflect the development of the industrial neighbourhood of Billancourt annexed in 1860. Many smaller French communes have been forced to merge, and double-barrelled names referring to two separate villages are not uncommon (e.g. Boutigny-Prouais in Eure-et-Loir).
- Corigliano-Rossano, Italian comune composed of two former towns of Corigliano Calabro and Rossano, merged in 2018
- Czechowice-Dziedzice, Polish town composed of two former settlements of Czechowice and Dziedzice, merged in 1951, under current name since 1958
- Czerwionka-Leszczyny, Polish town composed of two former towns of Czerwionka and Leszczyny, merged in 1962
- Dallas–Fort Worth is a metroplex and the usual name for the Dallas–Fort Worth–Arlington metropolitan area in Texas.
- Golub-Dobrzyń, Polish town composed of two former towns of Golub and Dobrzyń on opposite banks of the Drwęca River, merged in 1951
- Jelcz-Laskowice, Polish town composed of two former municipalities of Jelcz and Laskowice Oławskie, merged in 1987
- Kędzierzyn-Koźle, Polish city composed of two former towns of Kędzierzyn and Koźle, merged in 1975
- Knokke-Heist is a municipality located in the Belgian province of West Flanders. The municipality comprises the towns Knokke and Heist-aan-Zee that merged also with some other minor locations in 1971.
- Konstancin-Jeziorna, Polish town composed of two former towns of Skolimów-Konstancin and Jeziorna, merged in 1969
- Mänttä-Vilppula, Finnish town composed of two former municipalities of Mänttä and Vilppula, merged in 2009
- Morkovice-Slížany, Czech town composed of two former municipalities of Morkovice and Slížany, merged in 1960
- Popești-Leordeni, Romanian town composed of two former settlements of Popești and Leordeni, merged in 1873
- Rájec-Jestřebí, Czech town composed of two former municipalities of Rájec and Jestřebí, merged in 1960
- Ruciane-Nida, Polish town composed of two former settlements of Ruciane and Nida, merged in 1966
- Šaštín-Stráže, Slovak town composed of two former settlements of Šaštín and Stráže, merged in 1961
- Sedlec-Prčice, Czech town composed of two former municipalities of Sedlec and Prčice, merged in 1957
- Tel Aviv-Yafo, located on the Israeli coastal plain, was formed in 1950 when the ancient port city of Jaffa was merged with the Tel Aviv municipality to its north.

== Former place names ==
Includes defunct personal unions and dissolved political unions.

- Abruzzi e Molise: Abruzzo and Molise
- Araucania and Patagonia: Araucanía and Patagonia
- Austria-Hungary: Austria and Hungary
- Bithynia et Pontus: Bithynia and Pontus
- Corsica et Sardinia: Corsica and Sardinia
- Croatia-Slavonia: Croatia and Slavonia
- Denmark–Norway: Denmark and Norway
- Gilbert and Ellice Islands: Gilbert Islands and Ellice Islands
- Gorizia and Gradisca: Gorizia and Gradisca
- Hereford and Worcester: Herefordshire and Worcestershire
- Kalinga-Apayao: Kalinga and Apayao
- Lombardy–Venetia: Lombardy and Venetia
- Massa and Carrara: Massa and Carrara
- Modena and Reggio: Modena and Reggio
- Emirate of Nejd and Hasa: created when the Kingdom of Hejaz and Nejd annexed the al-Hasa region
- Kingdom of Hejaz and Nejd: created when the Sultanate of Nejd annexed the Kingdom of Hejaz
- Muscat and Oman: Muscat and Oman
- Ubangi-Shari: region between the Ubangi and Shari rivers
- Piedmont–Sardinia: Piedmont and Sardinia
- Poland–Lithuania: Poland and Lithuania
- Rhodesia and Nyasaland: Rhodesia and Nyasaland
- Ruanda-Urundi: Rwanda and Burundi
- Serbia and Montenegro: Serbia and Montenegro
- Río de Oro y Saguía el Hamra: Río de Oro and Saguía el-Hamra
- Sweden–Norway: Sweden and Norway
- United Kingdom of Great Britain and Ireland: Great Britain and Ireland
- Zimbabwe Rhodesia: Zimbabwe and Southern Rhodesia, two names for the same territory

== Triple placenames ==
- Barletta-Andria-Trani: Barletta, Andria and Trani, a province in the Italian region of Apulia
- Dallas–Fort Worth–Arlington: the metropolitan statistical area of Dallas (and two neighboring cities), Texas, United States
- Elobey, Annobón, and Corisco: Elobey, Annobón, and Corisco; a former Spanish territory
- EuroAirport Basel Mulhouse Freiburg, the name of airport situated between Mulhouse and Basel on the France–Switzerland border and near the German city of Freiburg.
- Mongmong-Toto-Maite: a village in the United States territory of Guam consisting of three traditional villages united after the Second World War.
- Provence-Alpes-Côte d'Azur: Provence, Alpes and Côte d'Azur, a region of France
- Rhondda Cynon Taff: River Rhondda, River Cynon and River Taff in Wales
- Saint Helena, Ascension and Tristan da Cunha, A British Overseas territory
- Seattle–Tacoma–Bellevue: the metropolitan statistical area of Seattle (and two neighboring cities), Washington state, United States
- Stormont, Dundas and Glengarry United Counties: a county in Ontario, Canada, consisting of the former counties of Stormont County, Dundas County, and Glengarry County.
- Tierra del Fuego, Antártida e Islas del Atlántico Sur, an Argentine province comprising its part of Tierra del Fuego island, Argentina's claims to Antarctica and Argentina's claims to the Falkland, South Georgia and South Sandwich Islands.
- Verbano-Cusio-Ossola: Verbano, Cusio and Ossola, a province in the Italian region of Piedmont
- Yau Tsim Mong District: Yau Ma Tei, Tsim Sha Tsui and Mong Kok, a district in Hong Kong

== Polycentric metropolitan areas ==
Metropolitan areas composed of multiple cities and shared facilities are often collectively named or referred to with the names of their principal component cities. These are conjoined with an unspaced en dash in formal writing, though not journalism, which hyphenates. Some examples include:

- Adana-Mersin Metropolitan Area, Turkey
- Amsterdam–The Hague–Rotterdam, Netherlands (also known collectively as the Randstad)
- Baltimore–Washington metropolitan area, Maryland and DC, United States
- Champaign–Urbana and University of Illinois Urbana–Champaign, US
- Dallas–Fort Worth, Texas, US
- Gulfport–Biloxi, Mississippi, US
- Minneapolis–St. Paul, Minnesota, US
- Osaka–Kobe–Kyoto, Japan (a.k.a. Keihanshin)
- Raleigh–Durham–Chapel Hill, North Carolina, US (a.k.a. the Research Triangle)
- Seattle–Tacoma, Washington (state), US
- Kitchener-Waterloo, Ontario, Canada
- Ottawa-Gatineau, Ontario and Quebec, Canada

Some may even be international conurbations (transborder agglomerations), and do not exist as geopolitical entities:

- Detroit–Windsor, US and Canada
- El Paso-Juarez, US and Mexico
- San Diego–Tijuana, US and Mexico

In cases where one of the cities in the metropolitan area is itself conjoined, some other form of punctuation may be used to separate them, e.g. Scranton/Wilkes-Barre, consisting of the cities of Scranton and Wilkes-Barre, Pennsylvania.

== Traditionally conjoined entities ==
Separate entities historically treated as one single unit by tradition or convention:

- Alsace-Lorraine: Alsace and Lorraine
- Baker and Howland Islands: Baker Island and Howland Island
- Bohemia and Moravia: Bohemia and Moravia
- England and Wales: England and Wales
- Eupen and Malmedy: Eupen and Malmedy
- Matthew and Hunter Islands: Matthew Island and Hunter Island
- Svalbard and Jan Mayen: Svalbard and Jan Mayen

=== United Kingdom ===
==== England ====
- Barking and Dagenham: Barking and Dagenham
- Bath and North East Somerset: Bath and north east Somerset
- Blackburn with Darwen: Blackburn with Darwen
- Brighton and Hove: Brighton and Hove
- Epsom and Ewell: Epsom and Ewell
- Hammersmith and Fulham: Hammersmith and Fulham
- Hinckley and Bosworth: Hinckley and Market Bosworth
- Kensington and Chelsea: Kensington and Chelsea
- Newark and Sherwood: Newark-on-Trent and Sherwood Forest
- Nuneaton and Bedworth: Nuneaton and Bedworth
- Redcar and Cleveland: Redcar and Cleveland
- Reigate and Banstead: Reigate and Banstead
- Telford and Wrekin: Telford and The Wrekin
- Tyne and Wear: River Tyne and River Wear
- Windsor and Maidenhead: Windsor and Maidenhead

==== Northern Ireland ====
- Dungannon and South Tyrone: Dungannon and south Tyrone
- Newry and Mourne: area around Newry and the Mourne Mountains

==== Scotland ====
- Dumfries and Galloway: Dumfriesshire and Galloway
- Lewis and Harris: one island consisting of Lewis and Harris
- Perth and Kinross: Perthshire and Kinross-shire
- Argyll and Bute: Argyll and Bute

==== Wales ====
- Neath Port Talbot: Neath and Port Talbot
- Rhondda Cynon Taff: River Rhondda, River Cynon, and River Taff

=== United States ===
- Dover-Foxcroft, Maine: created in 1922 by the merger of towns Dover and Foxcroft
- Elko New Market, Minnesota: created in 2006 from a merger of bordering cities Elko and New Market.
- Helena–West Helena, Arkansas: created in 2006 by the merger of the former cities of Helena and West Helena
- La Cañada Flintridge, California: created from unincorporated areas called La Cañada and Flintridge
- Leo-Cedarville, Indiana: created by the merger of Leo and Cedarville
- Lexington–Fayette, Kentucky: the official name of the merged city of Lexington and county of Fayette
- Little River-Academy, Texas: created from the merger of Little River and Academy in 1980
- Fuquay-Varina, North Carolina: created from the merger of Fuquay Springs and Varina
- McRae–Helena, Georgia: The two cities, McRae & Helena, merged in 2014.
- New Smyrna Beach, Florida: created from the merger of New Smyrna and Coronado Beach in 1947
- Pico Rivera, California: created from unincorporated areas called Pico and Rivera
- Melcher-Dallas, Iowa: created by the merger of the cities of Melcher and Dallas in 1986
- Miami-Dade County, Florida: The governments of Dade County and its largest city, Miami, have been merged since 1957, but the county did not take its current name until 1997, when county voters passed a referendum to that effect.
- Milton-Freewater, Oregon: created in 1951 from the merger of Milton and Freewater.
- Matanuska-Susitna Borough, Alaska: Named for Matanuska River and the town of Susitna.
- More than half of the land area of Alaska is within the Unorganized Borough which is administered directly by the state. Therefore, the United States Government considers the census areas within the Unorganized Borough to be county-equivalent entities. Three of these have double (or triple) names:
  - Prince of Wales – Hyder Census Area
  - Hoonah–Angoon Census Area
  - Yukon–Koyukuk Census Area
  - Another such area, the Valdez–Cordova Census Area, existed until January 2019, when it was split into the Chugach and Copper River Census Areas.
- Norwood Young America, Minnesota, formed in 1997 when the cities of Norwood and Young America merged.
- Sedro-Woolley, Washington, formed in 1898 from towns Sedro and Woolley
- Soddy-Daisy, Tennessee, created in 1969 by the incorporation of the former communities of Soddy and Daisy, plus some surrounding areas
- Texarkana, on the border between Texas and Arkansas, and near the triple point of those two states with Louisiana
- Winston-Salem, North Carolina, created by the 1913 merger of the towns of Winston and Salem.
- Wilkes-Barre, Pennsylvania, named after British Parliamentarians John Wilkes and Isaac Barré who were sympathetic to colonial concerns

=== Other countries ===
- Albury-Wodonga, Australia: incorporating the twin cities of Albury and Wodonga, divided by the Murray River which marks the border between states
- Brandýs nad Labem-Stará Boleslav, Czech Republic: created in 1960 from the merger of two towns (see also other Czech municipalities with hyphenated names)
- Dún Laoghaire–Rathdown: borough of Dún Laoghaire and barony of Rathdown in Ireland
- Corporation of the United Townships of Dysart, Dudley, Harcourt, Guilford, Harburn, Bruton, Havelock, Eyre and Clyde: official name of a municipality in central Ontario, Canada formed by the merger of nine smaller communities; more commonly known as "Dysart et al"
- Lethbridge, Morley's Siding, Brooklyn, Charleston, Jamestown, Portland, Winter Brook and Sweet Bay: official name of a local service district in Newfoundland and Labrador created in 2010 to improve fire protection in the eight named communities. More commonly called "Lethbridge to Sweet Bay", and branded as "Lethbridge and Area".
- Manawatū-Whanganui: Region of New Zealand, combining the regions of Manawatu and Whanganui river catchments
- Archipelago of San Andrés, Providencia and Santa Catalina: San Andrés Island and Providencia Island in Colombia
- Skanör med Falsterbo: a city formed from the conurbation of the two previous cities Skanör and Falsterbo in southwesternmost Sweden.

== Quadruple placenames ==
- Dadra and Nagar Haveli and Daman and Diu (India), combining
  - Dadra and Nagar Haveli, from Dadra and Nagar Haveli
  - Daman and Diu, from Daman and Diu

== See also ==
- Amalgamation (politics)
- Double-barrelled name
- Dual naming
- List of country name etymologies
- List of etymologies of administrative divisions
- List of tautological place names
- Toponymy
