= Cymru =

Welsh-language name for Wales

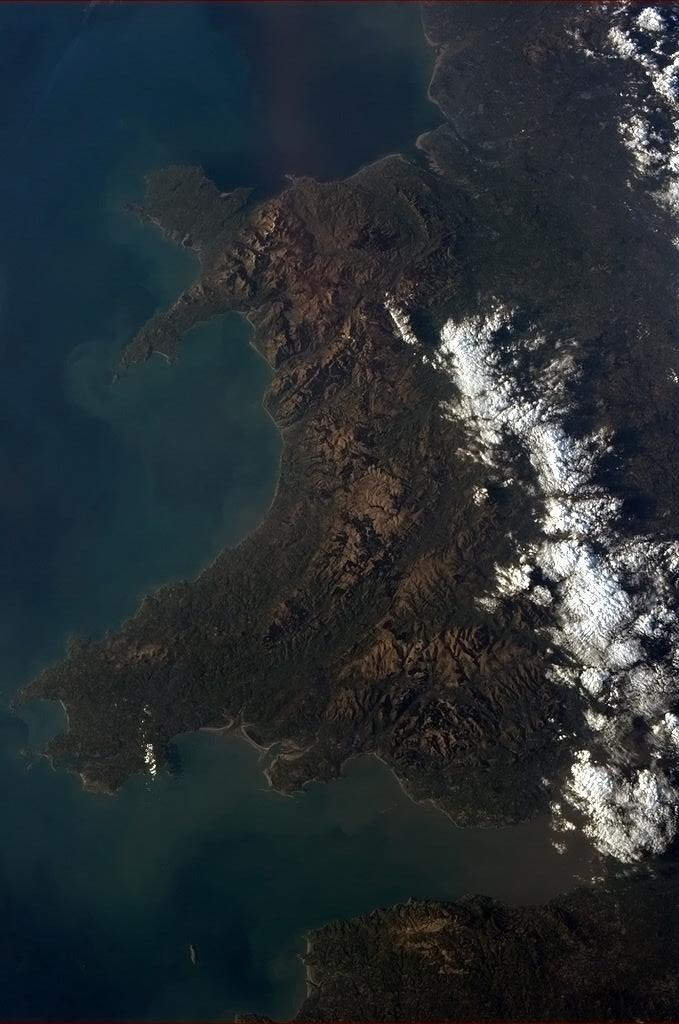
Satellite image of Wales.

Cymru (pronounced [ˈkəm.rɨ]) is the Welsh-language name for Wales, a country of the United Kingdom, on the island of Great Britain.

It, and the Welsh word Cymry referring to the Welsh people, are descended from the Brythonic word combrogi, meaning 'countrymen' or 'compatriots'.

The name is also used in English in the context to promote the Welsh language, including by politicians, in media, and in cultural settings, and holds strong significance in Welsh national identity. It is often used alongside, or in place of, the English name Wales in official and informal usage. There are movements by politicians and football organisations for it to be the only name for the country, ditching the name Wales.

== Etymology ==
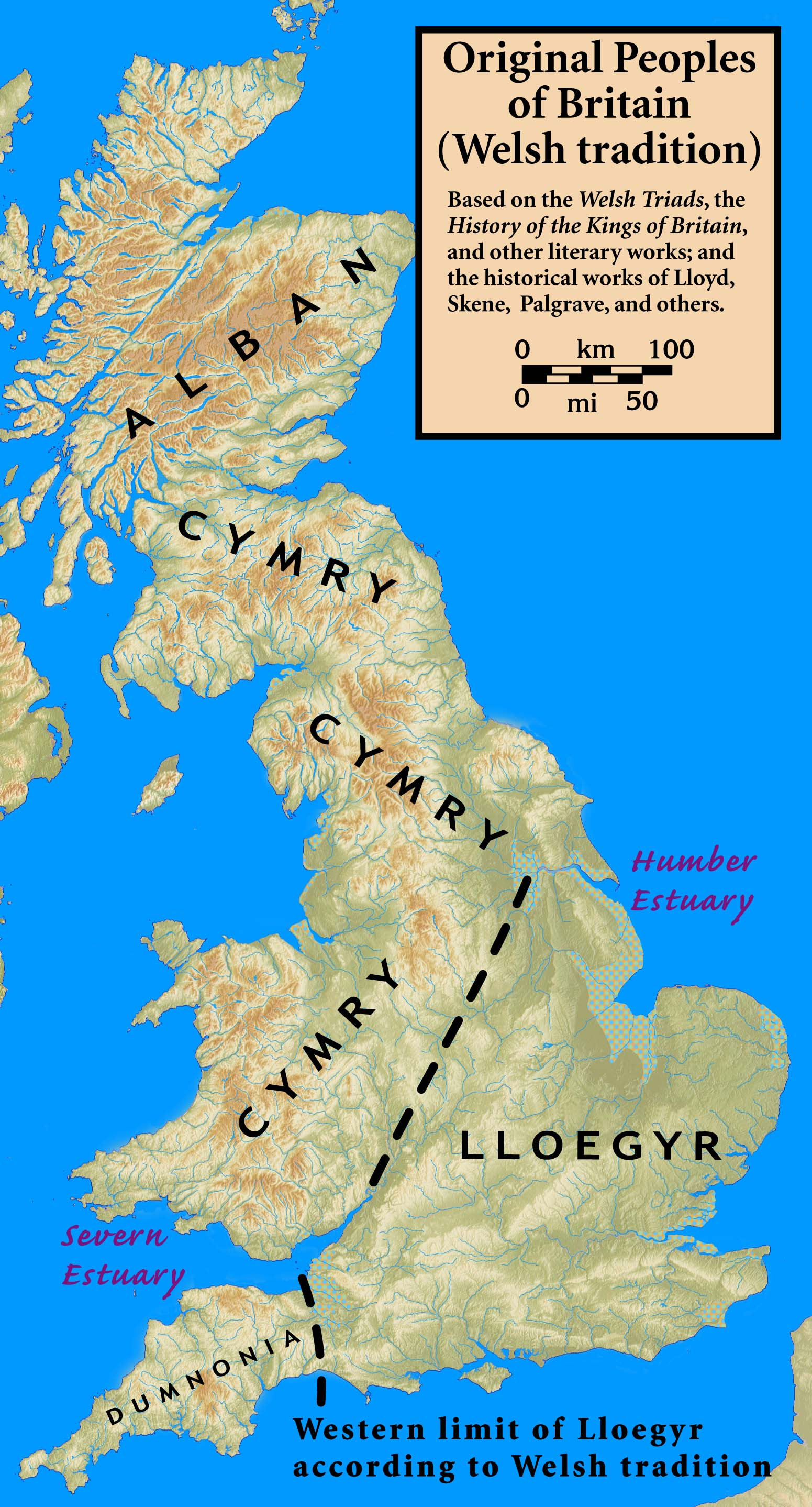

The modern Welsh name Cymru is the Welsh name for Wales, while the name for the Welsh people is Cymry. These words (both of which are pronounced [ˈkəm.rɨ]) are descended from the Brythonic word combrogi, meaning 'countrymen' or 'compatriots'. The use of the word Cymry as a self-designation derives from the location in the post-Roman era (after the arrival of the Anglo-Saxons) of the Welsh (Brythonic-speaking) people in modern Wales and in northern England and southern Scotland (Yr Hen Ogledd, 'The Old North'). It emphasised the Welsh in modern Wales and the Hen Ogledd were one people, different from other peoples. In particular, the term was not applied to the Cornish or the Breton peoples, who are of similar heritage, culture and language to the Welsh. The word came into use as a self-description probably before the 7th century. It is attested in a praise poem to Cadwallon ap Cadfan (Moliant Cadwallon, by Afan Ferddig) c. 633. In Welsh literature, the word Cymry was used throughout the Middle Ages to describe the Welsh, though the older, more generic term Brythoniaid continued to be used to describe any of the Britonnic peoples (including the Welsh) and was the more common literary term until c. 1200. Thereafter Cymry prevailed as a reference to the Welsh. Until c. 1560 the word was spelt Kymry or Cymry, regardless of whether it referred to the people or their homeland, including as Kymry, in the Armes Prydein, in the 10th century.

'Wales', on the other hand, is derived from an Old English word meaning 'foreigner', specifically those who were under Roman rule (specifically a 'Romanised foreigner'). Cambria is a medieval Latin name also historically used to refer to Wales, and is a latinisation of Cymru.

== Use of Cymru in English ==
In recent history, in particular following Welsh devolution, calls to drop English-language place-names in Wales in favour of their Welsh-language equivalents have been increasing. These have included calls to prohibit the coining of English-language names for places with existing names in Welsh and for all non-Welsh place-names in Wales to be removed. These attitudes have been criticised by the Daily Mail newspaper and by the British government. The controversial origin of the meaning of Wales, which derives from a term meaning 'foreigner', and it is stated to be an "imposed" non-Welsh name, are some of the reasons given for stopping the use of Wales, or at least to prefer Cymru. Proponents for such a change compare Wales's case to those of other countries which have changed their names in English-language usage, such as Ceylon to Sri Lanka, Persia to Iran and, in 2022, Turkey to Türkiye.

In 2019, during discussions on renaming the National Assembly for Wales, Senedd Cymru (transl. the Parliament of Wales) was considered as the body's sole potential name; however, this name was rejected by Assembly Members in November 2019. Simply "Senedd" was also proposed, but this was rejected by the first minister Carwyn Jones, who feared that it would not be understood. The parliament instead chose two names, Senedd Cymru and "Welsh Parliament", with "Senedd" being the shorthand name used in both English and Welsh. However, the legal preferred name, used in all post-2020 legislation, is Senedd Cymru in both languages.

In 2022, the Football Association of Wales considered changing references to the national football team (both men's and women's) to use Cymru rather than "Wales". The association already uses the name Cymru in its internal and external communications. This was seen as part of the team's overall shift towards becoming more Welsh nationalist and pro-independence. The association has been increasing its use of Cymru and Welsh words in general since UEFA Euro 2016.

=== Calls for use as the country's sole name ===
In 2024, a petition called for the prohibition of the name "Wales" and for the Welsh name Cymru to be the only name. The petition had gained 5,400 signatures by 4 January 2024, and over 10,000 by 15 January, meeting the threshold for a Senedd debate. A counter-petition was launched afterwards.

The petition follows other removals of English names in Wales in 2023, such as the removal of the English names "Snowdonia" and "Snowdon" for Eryri and Yr Wyddfa, their Welsh names respectively, and the removal of "Brecon Beacons" for Bannau Brycheiniog.

While Cymru is also used by pro-independence organisations such as YesCymru and AUOBCymru, it is also used by various non-political charities and organisations. The Democracy and Boundary Commission Cymru is a recent example of dropping Wales for Cymru in English.

== See also ==
- Cambria
- Gwalia
- Alba
- Éire
