= Etymology of Wales =

Origin of the name Wales

This article describes the etymology of Wales, a country of the United Kingdom.

== Origins ==
The English words "Wales" and "Welsh" derive from the same Old English root (singular Wealh, plural Wēalas), a descendant of Proto-Germanic *Walhaz, which was itself derived from the name of the Gaulish people known to the Romans as Volcae and which came to refer indiscriminately to inhabitants of the Western Roman Empire. The Old English-speaking Anglo-Saxons came to use the term to refer to the Britons in particular; the plural form Wēalas evolved into the name for their territory, Wales. The modern names for various Romance-speaking regions in Continental Europe (e.g. Wallonia, Wallachia, Wallis; Włochy, the Polish name for Italy; Welschland, the German name for the French-speaking part of Switzerland) have a similar etymology.

Historically in Britain, the words were not restricted to modern Wales or to the Welsh but were used to refer to anything that the Anglo-Saxons associated with the Britons, including other non-Germanic territories in Britain (e.g. Cornwall) and places in Anglo-Saxon territory associated with Britons (e.g. Walworth in County Durham and Walton in West Yorkshire).

== Other names ==
The modern Welsh name for themselves is Cymry, and Cymru is the Welsh name for Wales. These words (both of which are pronounced [ˈkəmrɨ]) are descended from the Brythonic word combrogi, meaning "fellow-countrymen". In Welsh literature, the word Cymry was used throughout the Middle Ages to describe the Welsh, though the older, more generic term Brythoniaid continued to be used to describe any of the Britonnic peoples (including the Welsh) and was the more common literary term until c. 1200. Thereafter Cymry prevailed as a reference to the Welsh. Until c. 1560 the word was spelt Kymry or Cymry, regardless of whether it referred to the people or their homeland. There have been discussions on whether Cymru should be used instead of Wales to refer to the country in English.

The Latinised forms of these names, Cambrian, Cambric and Cambria, survive as lesser-used alternative names for Wales, Welsh and the Welsh people. Examples include the Cambrian Mountains (which cover much of Wales and gave their name to the Cambrian geological period), the newspaper Cambrian News, and the organisations Cambrian Airways, Cambrian Railways, Cambrian Archaeological Association and the Royal Cambrian Academy of Art. Outside Wales, a related form survives as the name Cumbria in North West England, which was once a part of Yr Hen Ogledd. The Cumbric language, which is thought to have been closely related to Welsh, was spoken in this area until becoming extinct around the 12th century.
