= Dum Diversas =

1452 papal bull concerning imperialism

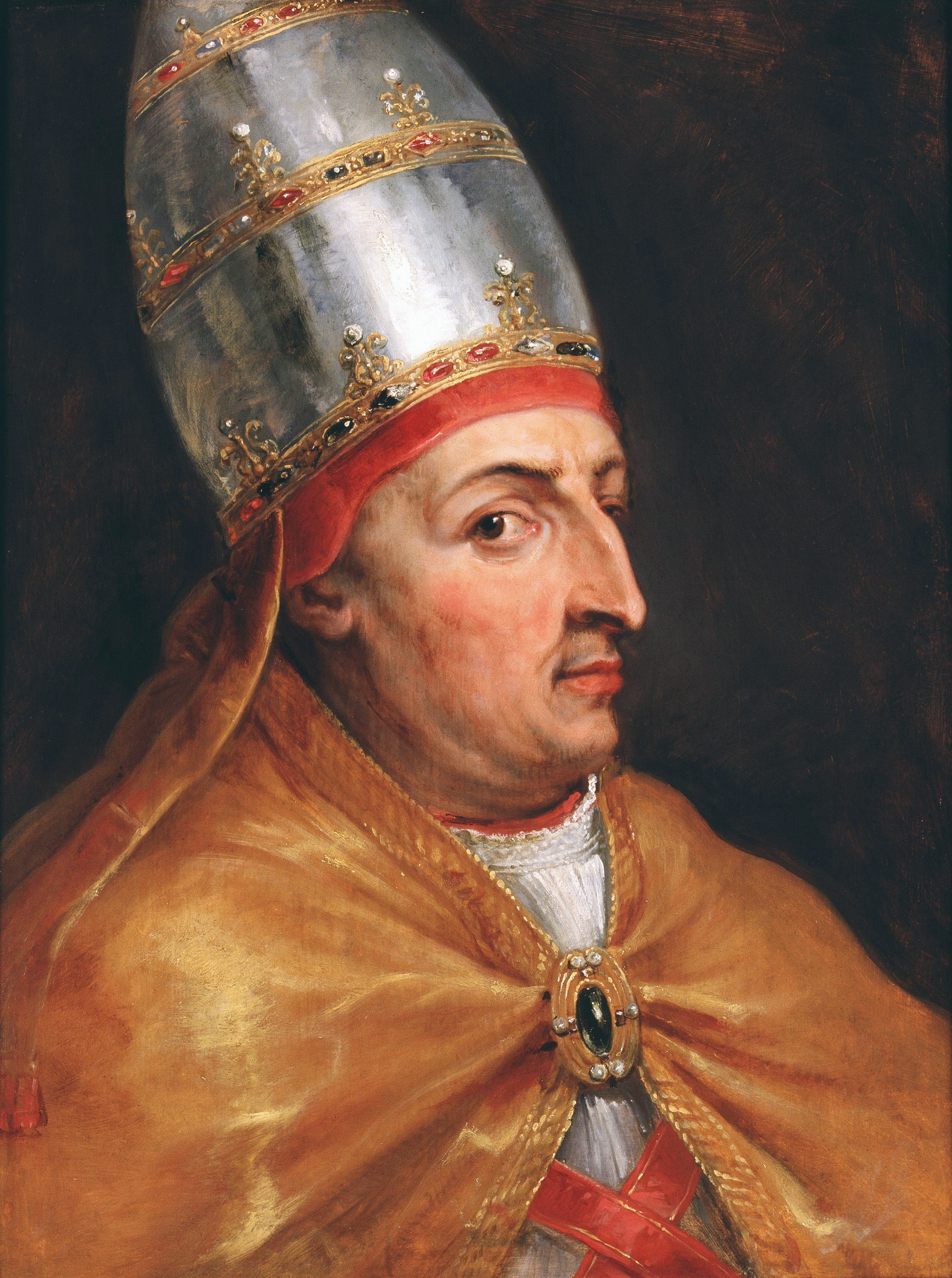
Pope Nicholas V

Dum Diversas (English: While different) is a papal bull issued on 18 June 1452 by Pope Nicholas V. It authorized King Afonso V of Portugal to fight, subjugate, and conquer "those rising against the Catholic faith and struggling to extinguish Christian Religion"—namely, the "Saracens (Muslims) and pagans" in a militarily disputed African territory. The document consigned warring enemies that lost to "perpetual servitude". This and the subsequent bull (Romanus Pontifex), issued by Nicholas in 1455, gave the Portuguese what they saw as moral justification to freely acquire slaves along the African coast by force or trade. The edicts are thus seen as having facilitated the Portuguese slave trade from West Africa and as having legitimized the European colonization of the African continent.

In the secular interpretation of religious doctrines present in Dum Diversas (concerning just wars and prisoner labor from those wars), the statement was used as a supposed moral recognition of both (a.) Portugal's rights to territories it had discovered along the West African coast as well as (b.) the reduction of innocent infidels to slaves and the defining of non-Christian territories as perpetual vassals of the Christian monarch.

Pope Calixtus III reiterated Nicholas in the 1456 bull Inter caetera (not to be confused with Alexander VI's bull of the same title), renewed by Pope Sixtus IV in 1481 and Pope Leo X in 1514 with Precelse denotionis. The concept for consigning exclusive spheres of influence to certain nation states was extended to the Americas in 1493 by Pope Alexander VI with Inter caetera. The use of innocent, innocuous infidels as forced labor slaves was also condemned by the Catholic Church in that era with statements such as Sublimius Deus by Pope Paul III. But in the end, Dum Diversas left an important legacy in developing European colonialism and its enslavement of African and American natives, with the exact intent of the Catholic Church to institute such a system of enslavement as well as the specifics of its role debated by historians to this day.

== Background ==
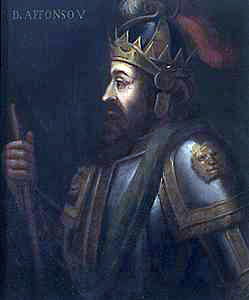
Afonso V of Portugal

By the summer of 1452 Ottoman Sultan Mehmed II had completed the Rumelihisarı fortress on the western or European side of the Bosporus. Located several miles north of Constantinople, it commanded the narrowest part of the strait. Byzantine Emperor Constantine XI wrote to Pope Nicholas for help. Issued less than a year before the Fall of Constantinople in 1453, the bull may have been intended to begin another crusade against the Ottoman Empire. It was not until Afonso V of Portugal responded to a papal call for aid against the Turks that Pope Nicholas V agreed to support the Portuguese claims regarding territory in Africa. Although some troops arrived from the mercantile city-states in the north of Italy, Pope Nicholas did not have the influence the Byzantines thought that he had over the Western kings and princes. France and England were both weakened by the Hundred Years' War, and Spain was still engaged in conflict with Islamic strongholds in Iberia. Any western contribution was not adequate to counterbalance Ottoman strength.

In mid-15th-century Portugal, the ideals of chivalric honour and crusading were seen as the path for ambition and success. During the reign of Afonso V, the Portuguese nobility enjoyed great influence and prestige, and for several decades, the House of Braganza was the wealthiest and most influential force in the kingdom. In 1415, the wisdom and the justice of an attack on Morocco had to be seriously weighed, but during the reign of Afonso V and for the century afterward, "such enterprises were accepted as self-justifying crusades for religion, chivalry, and honor".

The raids and attacks of the Reconquista created captives on both sides, who were either ransomed or sold as slaves. The Portuguese crown extended that to North Africa. After the attack on Ceuta, the king sought papal recognition of it as a crusade. Similarly, after the 1441 attack on Mauretania, the crown again sought the papal acknowledgement that it was part of a just conflict. Such a determination would then indicate that those captured could legitimately be sold as slaves.

== Content ==
To confirm the Portuguese trade rights, King Afonso V appealed to Pope Nicholas V for support, seeking the moral authority of the Church for his monopoly. The bull of 1452 was addressed to Afonso V and conceded Portugal's right to attack, conquer and subjugate Saracens and pagans:

... justly desiring that whatsoever concerns the integrity and spread of the faith, for which Christ our God shed his blood, shall flourish in the virtuous souls of the faithful ... we grant to you by these present documents, with our Apostolic Authority, full and free permission to invade, search out, capture and subjugate the Saracens and pagans and any other unbelievers and enemies of Christ wherever they may be, as well as their kingdoms, duchies, counties, principalities, and other property ... and to reduce their persons into perpetual slavery, and to apply and appropriate and convert to the use and profit of yourself and your successors, the Kings of Portugal, in perpetuity, the above-mentioned kingdoms, duchies, counties, principalities, and other property and possessions and suchlike goods ...

Wilhelm Grewe finds Dum Diversas essentially "geographically unlimited" in its application, perhaps the most important papal act relating to Portuguese colonisation. Although undefined, Richard Raiswell says that it clearly refers to the recently discovered lands along the coast of West Africa. Portuguese ventures were intended to compete with the Muslim trans-Sahara caravans, which held a monopoly on West African gold and ivory.

== Inter caetera of 1456 ==
Pope Calixtus III reiterated the main points of Dum Diversas in his bull four years later, Inter Caetera of 1456. Once again the Pope was attempting to raise support for a campaign against the advance of the Turks. Nuncios had been dispatched to all the countries of Europe to beseech the princes to join once more in an effort to check the danger of a Turkish invasion. However, the princes of Europe were slow in responding to the call of the pope, largely due to their own national rivalries. On 29 June 1456, Callixtus ordered the church bells to be rung at noon (see noon bell) as a call to prayer for the welfare of those defending Belgrade. Forces led by Janos Hunyady, Captain-General of Hungary, met the Turks and defeated them at Belgrade on 22 July 1456.

On 13 March 1456, Callixtus issued the papal bull Inter caetera (not to be confused with Inter caetera of 1493). This bull reaffirmed the earlier bulls Dum Diversas and Romanus Pontifex, which recognized Portugal's rights to territories it had discovered along the West African coast, and the reduction of the infidels and non-Christians territories to perpetual vassals of the Christian monarch.

King Afonso had requested that ecclesiastical jurisdiction over lands located in the vicinity of the southern shore of Guinea be vested with the Order of Christ, the successor organization to the Knights Templar in Portugal. (His uncle, Infante Henry, was the Grand Master.) The conquest of these lands "which the said infante withdrew with mailed hands from the hand of the Saracen", had been funded by the resources of the Order.

Some historians view these bulls together as extending the theological legacy of Pope Urban II's Crusades to justify European colonization and expansionism, accommodating "both the marketplace and the yearnings of the Christian soul." A combination of pragmatism, fear of the Turks, and lobbying by vested interests meant that the crusade was associated with discovery well into the sixteenth century. The proclamations' long-term implications were, of course, not realized at the time.

In 1537, Pope Paul III condemned "unjust" enslavement of non-Christians in Sublimus Dei. The Pope commented that the Indians were being alienated from Christianity by the injuries and injustices they suffered at the hands of the conquerors. This letter was strikingly similar to the 1435 letter by Pope Eugene IV, Sicut Dudum, which forbade the enslavement of the native peoples of the Canary Islands. However, neither Pope went against common Catholic doctrine regarding the morality of servitude through capture in a "just war". In 1686, the Holy Office limited the bull by decreeing that Africans enslaved by unjust wars should be freed.

Dum Diversas, along with other bulls such as Romanus Pontifex (1455), Ineffabilis et summi (1497), Dudum pro parte (1516), and Aequum reputamus (1534) document the Portuguese jus patronatus. Pope Alexander VI, a native of Valencia, issued a series of bulls limiting Portuguese power in favor of that of Spain, most notably Dudum siquidem (1493).

== See also ==
- Catholic Church and the Age of Discovery
- Sicut Dudum

== Bibliography ==
- Bown, Stephen R. (2012). 1494: How a Family Feud in Medieval Spain Divided the World in Half. Macmillan. ISBN 978-0-312-61612-0.
- Davenport, Frances Gardiner; Paullin, Charles Oscar (1917). European Treaties Bearing on the History of the United States and Its Dependencies to 1684. Carnegie Institution of Washington.
- Housley, Norman. Religious Warfare in Europe 1400-1536, p. 187, Oxford University Press, 2002 ISBN 9780198208112
- Maxwell, John Francis (1975). The Catholic Church and Slavery. Barry-Rose Publishers.
- Payne, Samuel G., A History of Spain and Portugal, Vol.1, Chapt. 10
