= Catholic Church and the Age of Discovery =

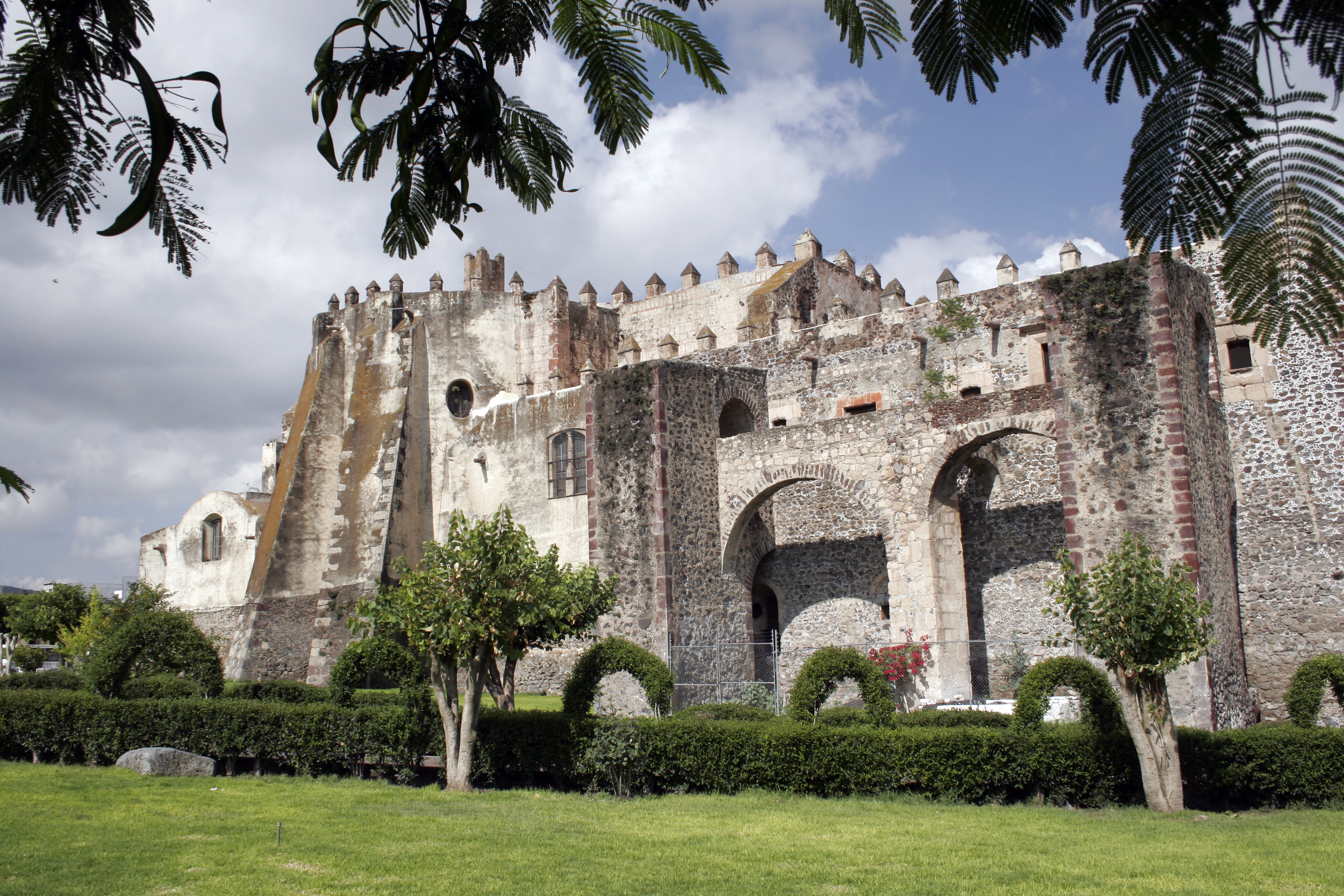
The convent of San Augustin, a mission centre established at Yuriria, Mexico in 1550

During the Age of Discovery, the Catholic Church inaugurated a major effort to spread Christianity (Catholicism) in the New World, Asia, and Africa, and to convert the Indigenous peoples of the Americas and other indigenous peoples. The evangelical effort was a major part of, and a justification for, the military conquests of European powers such as Portugal, Spain, and France. Christian missions to the indigenous peoples ran hand-in-hand with the colonial efforts of Catholic nations. In the Americas and other colonies in Asia, and Africa, most missions were run by religious orders such as the Franciscans, Dominicans, Augustinians, and Jesuits. In Mexico, the early systematic evangelization by mendicants came to be known as the "Spiritual Conquest of Mexico".

Antonio de Montesinos, a Dominican friar on the island of Hispaniola, was the first member of the clergy to publicly denounce all forms of enslavement and oppression of the indigenous peoples of the Americas. Theologians such as Francisco de Vitoria and Bartolomé de las Casas drew up theological and philosophical bases for the defense of the human rights of the colonized native populations, thus creating the basis of international law, regulating the relationships between nations. Important contemporary ecclesiastical documents taking a strong stance on enslaving or despoiling the indigenous peoples of the Americas was the ecclesiastical letter Pastorale officium and the superseding encyclical Sublimis Deus.

In the early years, most mission work was undertaken by the religious orders. Over time it was intended that a normal church structure would be established in the mission areas. The process began with the formation of special jurisdictions, known as apostolic prefectures and apostolic vicariates. These developing churches eventually graduated to regular diocesan status with the appointment of a local bishop. After decolonization, this process increased in pace as church structures altered to reflect new political-administrative realities.

== Background ==
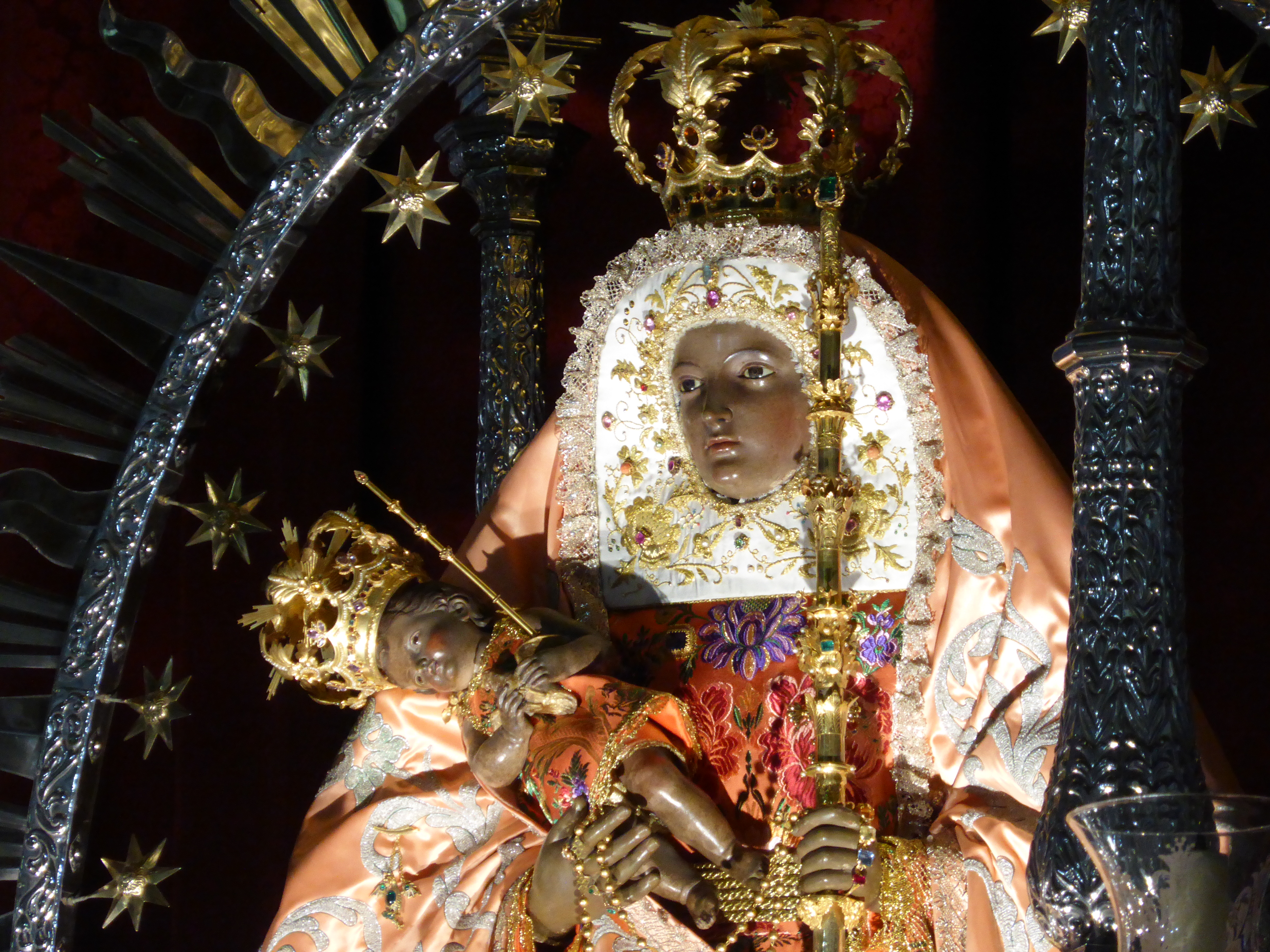
La Virgen de Candelaria, Patron of the Canary Islands

In 1341, a three-ship expedition sponsored by King Afonso IV of Portugal, set out from Lisbon for the Canary Islands. The expedition spent five months mapping the islands. This expedition became the basis of Portuguese claims to the islands.

In 1344, the Castilian-French noble Luis de la Cerda (Count of Clermont and Admiral of France), and French ambassador to the papal court in Avignon, proposed to Pope Clement VI, conquering the islands and converting the native Guanches to Christianity. In November 1344, Clement VI issued the bull Tu devonitis sinceritas bestowing upon Luis de la Cerda the title of sovereign "Prince of Fortuna". Clement also urged the kings of Portugal and Castile to provide assistance to Cerda's expedition. The Portuguese king Afonso IV immediately lodged a protest, as did Alfonso XI of Castile. Preparations were delayed and no expedition was mounted before Cerda's death in 1348.

The raids and attacks of the Reconquista created captives on both sides, who were either ransomed or sold as slaves. During the dynastic wars of the 1370s, between Portugal and Castile, Portuguese and Castilian privateers made for the Canaries for shelter or slaving raids.

In 1415, the Portuguese captured the city of Ceuta and continued to expand their control along the coast of Morocco. Portuguese ventures were intended to compete with the Muslim trans-Sahara caravans, which held a monopoly on West African gold and ivory. In 1418 the Portuguese began to settle the Madeira Islands, at first prized for their wood and later cane sugar. By 1427 they had reached the Azores. Portugal and Spain continued to dispute control of the Canary Islands.

== Age of Discovery ==
=== Creator omnium ===
The Castilian conquest of the islands began in 1402, with the expedition of Jean de Béthencourt and Gadifer de la Salle, on commission of Henry III of Castile. The expedition included two Franciscan friars. Lanzarote, and later Fuerteventura and El Hierro were occupied, and the Bishopric of the Canaries was established.

In 1434, Prince Henry of Portugal attempted to invade Gran Canaria. When a landing was repulsed by the Guanches, the native Berber inhabitants, the expedition then plundered the Castilian missions on Lanzarote and Fuerteventura. A complaint was lodged by Fernando Calvetos, the Castilian bishop of San Marcial del Rubicón in Lanzarote, supported by the archbishop of Seville. Calvetos informed the pope of the pillaging carried out by the Portuguese "pirates". Pope Eugene IV issued Regimini gregis on 29 September 1434, and Creator Omnium, on 17 December 1434, forbidding any further raids on the Canaries and ordered the immediate manumission of all Christian converts enslaved during the attack.

While Creator omnium was issued in response to Portuguese depredations on Castilian settlements in the Canaries, the following month Pope Eugene issued the broader Sicut Dudum, indicating that Castilian slavers were not exempt and requiring that residents of the Canary Islands who had been enslaved were to be set free within fifteen days of publication of the bull upon penalty of excommunication.

=== Dum diversas ===
According to Stanley G. Payne, "[T]he expansion of the faith was inextricably intertwined with military glory and economic profit. Because of this it is idle to ask, as is frequently done, whether the Portuguese pioneers and Castilian conquistadores were motivated more by greed or by religious zeal. In the Hispanic crusading expansionist ideology, the two went together."

When Islam presented a serious military threat to Italy and Central Europe during the mid-15th century, Pope Nicholas V tried to unite Christendom against them but failed. He then granted Portugal the right to subdue and even enslave Muslims, pagans and other unbelievers in the papal bull Dum Diversas (1452). The following year saw the Fall of Constantinople to Muslim invaders. Several decades later, European colonizers and missionaries spread Catholicism to the Americas, Asia, Africa and Oceania. Pope Alexander VI had awarded colonial rights over most of the newly discovered lands to Spain and Portugal. Under the patronato system, however, state authorities, not the Vatican, controlled all clerical appointments in the new colonies. Thus, the 1455 Papal Bull Romanus Pontifex granted the Portuguese all lands behind Cape Bojador and allows to reduce pagans and other enemies of Christ to perpetual slavery.

Later, the 1481 Papal Bull Aeterni regis granted all lands south of the Canary Islands to Portugal, while in May 1493 the Spanish-born Pope Alexander VI decreed in the Bull Inter caetera that all lands west of a meridian only 100 leagues west of the Cape Verde Islands should belong to Spain while new lands discovered east of that line would belong to Portugal. A further Bull, Dudum siquidem, made some more concessions to Spain, and the pope's arrangements were then amended by the Treaty of Tordesillas of 1494 negotiated between Spain and Portugal. Portugal's patronage was termed thepadroado.

After the discovery of the Americas, many of the clergy sent to the New World began to criticize Spain and the Church's treatment of indigenous peoples. In December 1511, Antonio de Montesinos, a Dominican friar, openly rebuked the Spanish rulers of Hispaniola for their "cruelty and tyranny" in dealing with the natives. King Ferdinand enacted the Laws of Burgos and Valladolid in response. However enforcement was lax, and the New Laws of 1542 took a stronger line. This caused a revolt among the Spanish colonists, and the alarmed government backed down, softening the effect of the laws. Some historians blame the Church for not doing enough to liberate the Indians; others point to the Church as the only voice raised on behalf of indigenous peoples. The issue resulted in a crisis of conscience in 16th-century Spain. The reaction of Catholic writers such as Bartolomé de Las Casas and Francisco de Vitoria led to debate on the nature of human rights and the birth of modern international law. (French, English, and Dutch reactions against the maritime monopolies granted to Portugal and Spain, meanwhile, culminated in Hugo Grotius's work articulating the doctrine of freedom of the seas.)

In 1524, Franciscan missionaries known as the Twelve Apostles of Mexico arrived in what is New Spain, followed by the Dominicans in 1526, and the Augustinians in 1533. They worked hard to convert the Indians and to provide for their well-being by establishing schools and hospitals. Because some people questioned whether the Indians were truly men who deserved baptism, Pope Paul III in the papal bull Veritas Ipsa or Sublimis Deus (1537) confirmed that the Indians were deserving men. Afterward, the conversion effort gained momentum.

=== School of Salamanca ===
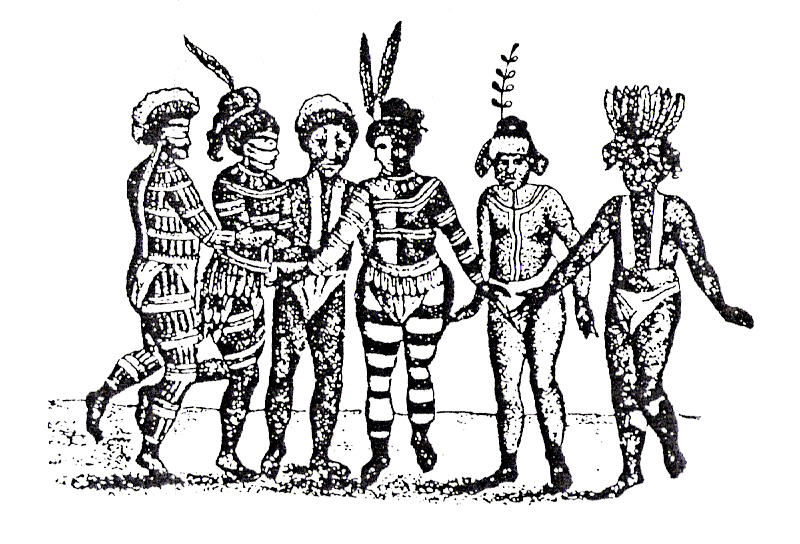
An early visitor to California sketched a group of Costeño dancers at Mission San José with their bodies painted to resemble the patterns in Spanish military uniforms.

The School of Salamanca, which gathered theologians such as the Dominican Francisco de Vitoria (c. 1483–1546), and later theologians, such as the highly influential Jesuit Francisco Suárez (1548–1617), argued in favor of the existence of rights to indigenous peoples. For example, these theologians thought that it was illegitimate to conquer other peoples for religious reasons, or even to force the baptisms of non-Christian subjects. Their views on non-believers had been already established by medieval discussions of Jewish and Muslim subjects of Christian princes. Although this view was not always prevalent, it was the traditional Dominican and Thomist view, and reflected the practice of late antiquity and the early Middle Ages.

However, while such theologians limited Charles V's imperial powers over colonized people, they also mentioned some legitimate reasons for the conquest. For instance, on their view, war might be justified if the indigenous people refused free transit and commerce to the Europeans; if they forced converts to return to idolatry; if there come to be a sufficient number of Christians in the newly discovered land that they wish to receive from the Pope a Christian government; if the indigenous people lacked just laws, magistrates, agricultural techniques, etc. In any case, title taken according to this principle must be exercised with Christian charity, warned Suárez, and for the advantage of the Indians. More traditional theologians legitimized the conquest while at the same time limiting the absolute power of the sovereign, which was celebrated in others parts of Europe under the developing notion of the divine right of kings.

== Conversions and assimilation ==
The conquest was immediately accompanied by evangelization, and new, local forms of Catholicism appeared. The Virgin of Guadalupe is one of Mexico's oldest religious images, and is said to have appeared to Juan Diego Cuauhtlatoatzin in 1531. News of the 1534 apparition on Tepayac Hill spread quickly through Mexico. Between 1532 and 1538, the local people accepted the Spaniards and 8 million people were converted to the Catholic faith. Thereafter, the Aztecs no longer practiced human sacrifice or native forms of worship. In 2001 the Italian Movement of Love Saint Juan Diego was created, and launched evangelization projects in 32 states. A year later, Juan Diego was canonized by Pope John Paul II.

Guadalupe is often considered a mixture of the cultures which blend to form Mexico, both racially and religiously. Guadalupe is sometimes called the "first mestiza" or "the first Mexican". Mary O'Connor writes that Guadalupe "bring[s] together people of distinct cultural heritages, while at the same time affirming their distinctness".

One theory is that the Virgin of Guadalupe was presented to the Aztecs as a sort of "Christianized" Tonantzin, necessary for the clergymen to convert the indigenous people to their faith. As Jacques Lafaye wrote in Quetzalcoatl and Guadalupe, "as the Christians built their first churches with the rubble and the columns of the ancient pagan temples, so they often borrowed pagan customs for their own cult purposes".

Such Virgins appeared in most of the other evangelized countries, mixing Catholicism with the local customs:

- The Basilica of Our Lady of Copacabana was built in Bolivia, near the Isla del Sol where the Sun God was believed to be born, in the 16th century, to commemorate the apparition of the Virgin of Copacabana.
- In Cuba the Virgin named Caridad del Cobre was allegedly seen in the beginning of the 16th century, a case consigned in the Archivo General de Indias.
- In Brazil Our Lady of Aparecida was declared in 1929 official Patron Saint of the country by Pope Pius XI.
- Our Lady of Luján in Argentina.
- La Negrita in Costa Rica.

== Religious orders ==
=== Jesuits ===
The Altar of St. Francis Xavier Parish in Nasugbu, Batangas, Philippines. St. Francis is the principal patron of the town, together with Our Lady of Escalera.

The first attempt by Jesuits to reach China was made in 1552 by St. Francis Xavier, Navarrese priest and missionary and founding member of the Society. Xavier, however, died the same year on the Chinese island of Shangchuan, without having reached the mainland. Three decades later, in 1582, led by several figures including the prominent Italian Matteo Ricci, Jesuits once again initiated mission work in China, ultimately introducing Western science, mathematics, astronomy, and visual arts to the imperial court, and carrying on significant inter-cultural and philosophical dialogue with Chinese scholars, particularly representatives of Confucianism. At the time of their peak influence, members of the Jesuit delegation were considered some of the emperor's most valued and trusted advisors, holding numerous prestigious posts in the imperial government. Many Chinese, including notable former Confucian scholars, adopted Christianity and became priests and members of the Society of Jesus.

Between the 18th and mid-19th century, nearly all Western missionaries in China were forced to conduct their teaching and other activities covertly.

Elsewhere, Jesuit missionary Francis Xavier introduced Christianity to Japan. By the end of the 16th century tens of thousands of Japanese followed Roman Catholicism. Church growth came to a halt in 1635 under the Shogun Tokugawa Iemitsu who, in an effort to isolate the country from foreign influences, launched a severe persecution of Christians. Japanese were forbidden to leave the country and Europeans were forbidden to enter. Despite this, a minority Christian population survived into the 19th century.

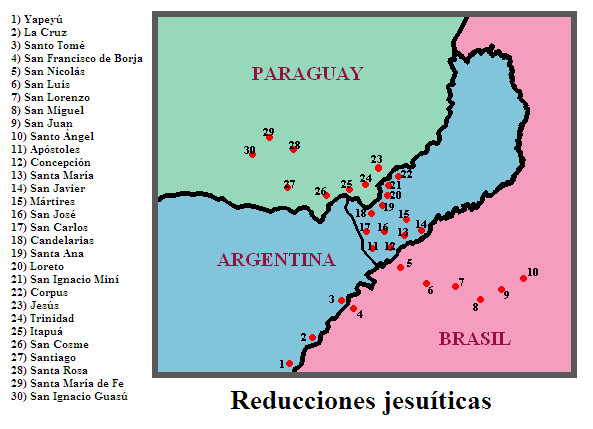
Location of the most important Jesuit Reductions in the Southern Cone, with present political divisions.

In South America, the Jesuits protected native peoples from enslavement by establishing semi-independent settlements called reductions. Pope Gregory XVI, challenging Spanish and Portuguese sovereignty, appointed his own candidates as bishops in the colonies, condemned slavery and the slave trade in 1839 (papal bull In supremo apostolatus), and approved the ordination of native clergy in spite of government racism.

Many buildings erected by the Jesuits still stand, such as the Cathedral of Saint Paul in Macau and the Santísima Trinidad de Paraná in Paraguay, an example of a Jesuit Reduction.

== Empires and missions ==
Beginning in the 1450s, Catholic missions were administered through patronage rights (jus patronatus).

=== Spanish missions ===
In Las Californias Province of New Spain in the Americas, the Catholic Church expanded its missions in cooperation with the Spanish government and military to colonize California, coming about in response to news of Russian and British trappers and merchants in the region. Junípero Serra, the Franciscan priest in charge of this effort, founded a series of mission stations which became economic, political, and religious institutions. These missions brought grain, cattle, and a changed homeland for the California Native Americans. They had no immunity to European diseases, with subsequent indigenous tribal population falls. However, by bringing Western civilization to the area, these missions and the Spanish government have been held responsible for wiping out nearly a third of the native population, primarily through disease. Overland routes were established from New Spain (Mexico) that resulted in the establishment of a mission and presidio (fort) - now San Francisco (1776), and a pueblo (town) - now Los Angeles (1781).

=== French missions ===
The French colonial effort began later than that of the Spanish or Portuguese.

==== Hawaii: The French Incident (1839) ====
Under the rule of Kaʻahumanu the newly converted Protestant widow of Kamehameha the Great, Catholicism was illegal in Hawaii and chiefs loyal to her forcibly deported French priests or had them imprisoned. Native Hawaiian Catholic converts were imprisoned and Protestant ministers ordered them to be tortured. The prejudice against the French Catholics missionaries remained the same under the reign of her successor, the Kuhina Nui Ka'ahumanu II. In 1839 Captain Laplace of the French frigate Artémise sailed to Hawaii under orders to

destroy the malevolent impression which you find established to the detriment of the French name; to rectify the erroneous opinion which has been created as to the power of France; and to make it well understood that it would be to the advantage of the chiefs of those islands of the Ocean to conduct themselves in such a manner as not to incur the wrath of France. You will exact, if necessary with all the force that is yours to use, complete reparation for the wrongs which have been committed, and you will not quit those places until you have left in all minds a solid and lasting impression.

== Secularization and decolonization ==
Decolonization in Central and South America began with the revolutions in the 1820s, with all countries becoming independent then, except Puerto Rico and Cuba in 1898. Leaders were inspired by the American Revolution and the French Revolution of the late 18th century.

== Emergence of the American Catholic Church ==
In the late 18th and early 19th centuries, the Roman Catholic Church experienced unique difficulties within the United States of America. "Unlike all Protestant churches in America, the Roman Catholic church depended for its identity upon keeping doctrinal and administrative unity with a European-based authority." The papacy was cautious of the freedom found in the United States as it showed similarities to the attitudes behind the French Revolution. The papacy wanted to preserve the hierarchy of the church in the United States. At this time, Catholics were chiefly located in Pennsylvania and Maryland and were greatly influenced by their Protestant neighbors. They, too, wanted a church that empowered the laity. In 1788 John Carroll was appointed the first Bishop of the United States. He struggled to balance the desires of the US trustees to adapt and empower the laity and hold church property with the requests of the bishops and hierarchy oversees to preserve the doctrine. This controversy ran from approximately 1780 to 1850. In the end, the power and authority were too differential and the bishops won. This marked the creation of the "American Catholic Church with the laity subordinate to priest and bishop". This system remained until the mid-20th century.

=== Beginnings of the American Catholic school system ===
In the early-to-mid-19th century, schools in the United States were greatly influenced by Protestantism. This created difficulties with American Catholics. They challenged the singing of Protestant hymns and reading of the King James Bible in the classroom. Some school boards made changes to be more non-denominational. Tensions were great during this time period as Americans were already fearful of immigration and Catholics. After a number of struggles, for a variety of reasons, American Catholics began creating their own schools in the 1840s. Archbishop at the time, John Hughes, insisted that Catholic education was the primary way to preserve proper Christian teaching. He cited education at a young age promoted the reason and experience necessary for a strong religious background. He called American Catholics "to multiply our schools, and to perfect them". By 1852 the bishops recommended "Catholic children should attend only schools that were under church control".

== 20th century ==
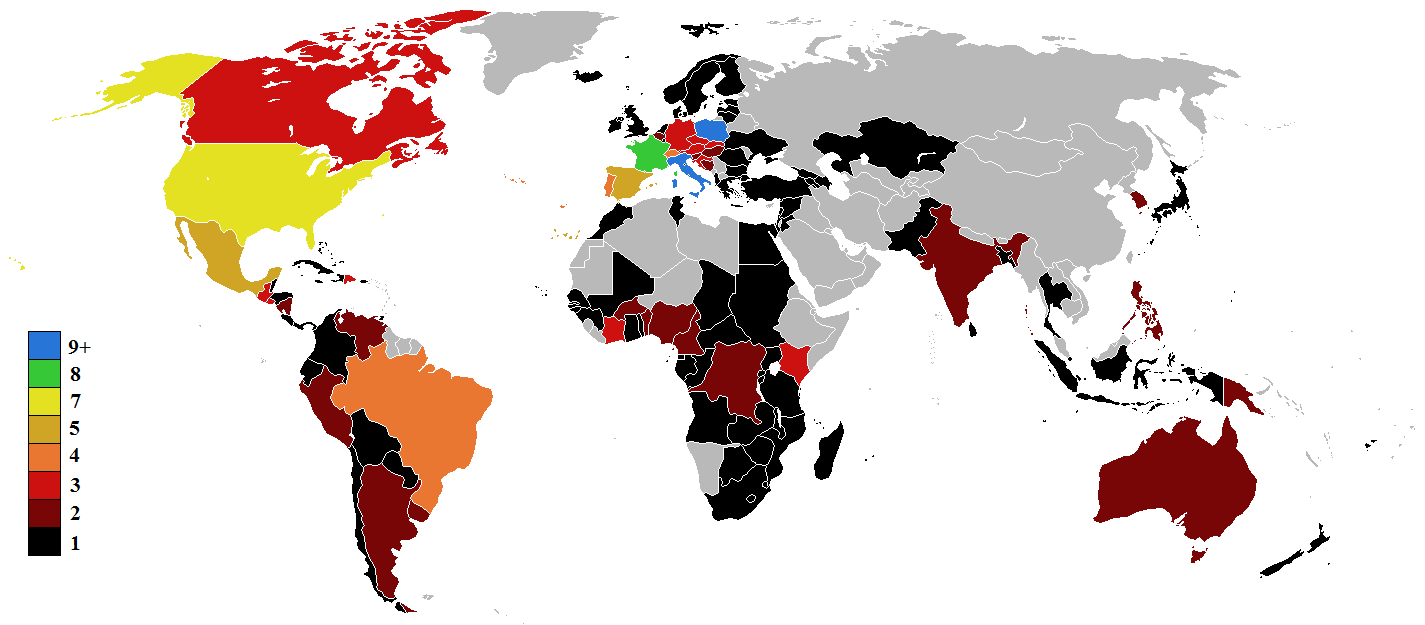
Map indicating countries visited by John Paul II.

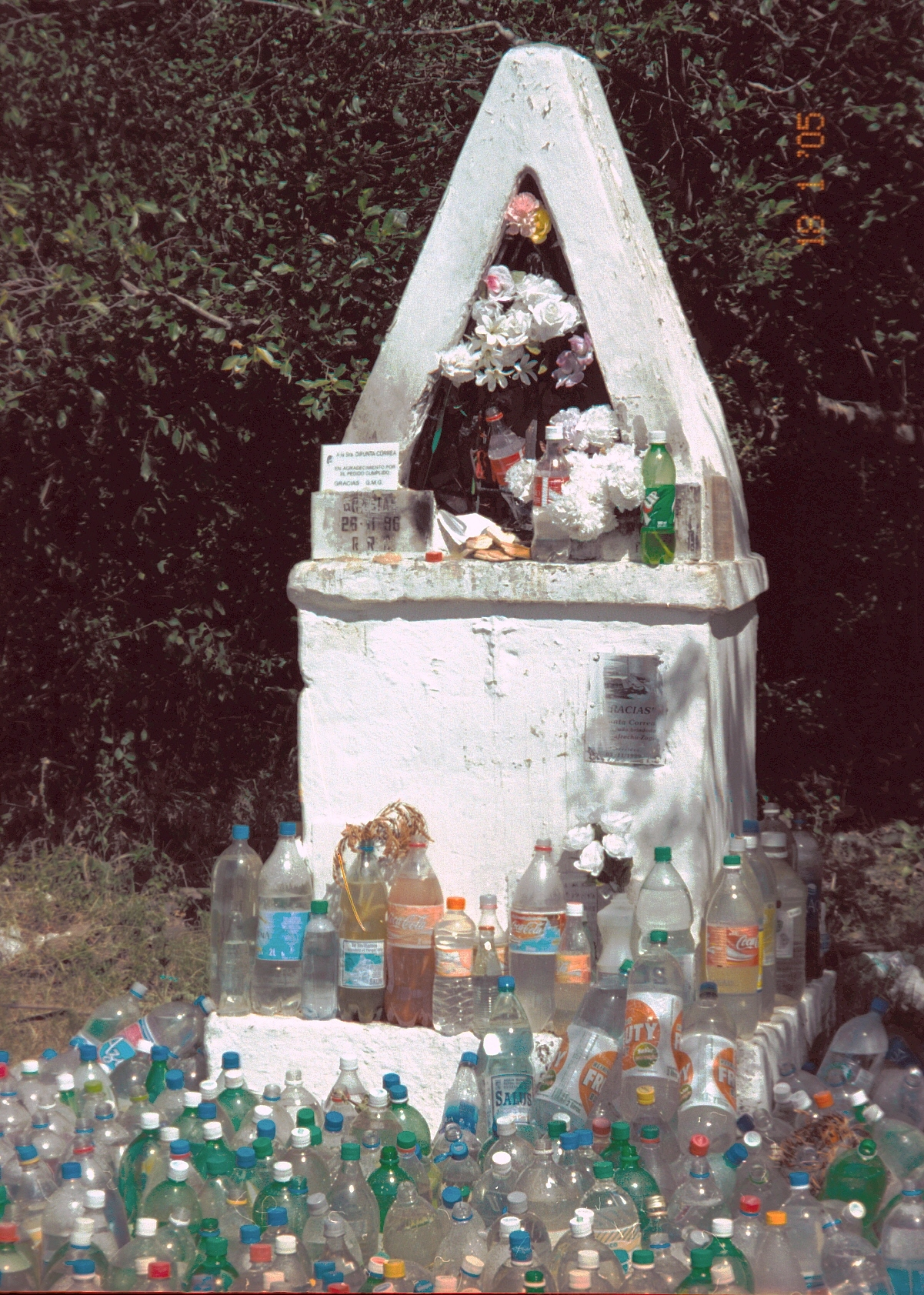
Sanctuary dedicated to the Difunta Correa, a semi-pagan saint, located in Uruguay, between the Tacuarembó and Paso de los Toros cities.

The Catholic faith also became integrated in the industrial and post-industrial middle class as it developed, in particular through the lay movements created following the 1891 Rerum novarum encyclical enacted by Pope Leo XIII, and which insisted on the social role of the Roman Catholic Church. New ceremonies appeared throughout the 20th century, such as Fidencio Constantino Sintora (known as the Niño Fidencio) (1898–1938) in Mexico, the Santa Muerte in Mexico (who has been attacked by the Catholic Church as being a pagan figure) or Difunta Correa in Argentina. The latter's pilgrimage site was visited by 700 000 persons in 2005.

== Legacy and issues ==
=== 20th-century missions ===
Much Catholic missionary work has undergone a profound change since the Second Vatican Council (1962–1965), and has become explicitly conscious of the dangers of cultural imperialism or economic exploitation. Contemporary Christian missionaries try to observe the principles of inculturation in their missionary work. In the 1970s, the Jesuits would become a main proponent of the liberation theology which openly supported anti-imperialist movements. It was officially condemned in 1984 and in 1986 by then-Cardinal Ratzinger (later Pope Benedict XVI) as the head of the Congregation for the Doctrine of the Faith, under charges of Marxist tendencies, while Leonardo Boff was suspended. Proselytism has continued however throughout the 20th century, with Latin America accounting for the largest Catholic population in the world. But since the 1960s, Protestant evangelism and new religious movements have begun to strongly compete with Catholicism in South America, while various approaches to evangelism have been developed. In response, Pope John Paul II made frequent travels to this continent, visiting among other countries Chile during Pinochet's rule. He also supported Catholic Charismatic Renewal movements against rival Charismatic movements, and groups such as the Neocatechumenal Way (which has close to 20,000 communities in Latin America and 600,000 members alone), Focolari, Comunione e Liberazione or the Opus Dei, which are main vectors of Roman Catholicism in the region. In the 1990 encyclical Redemptoris Missio (subtitled On the permanent validity of the Church's missionary mandate), John Paul II stressed "the urgency of missionary activity" and in which he wished "to invite the Church to renew her missionary commitment".

=== Ethnocide and challenges ===
After a journey among the Bari in South America, the ethnologist Robert Jaulin called for a convention on ethnocide in the Americas at the Congress of Americanists, and, in February 1970, the French Society of Americanists convened for that purpose. Jaulin criticized in particular the role of Christian missionaries towards non-Western cultures.

=== Pope Francis positions ===
On August 9, 2019, Pope Francis argued that isolationism and populism lead to war and stated that "the whole is greater than the parts. Globalization and unity should not be conceived as a sphere, but as a polyhedron: each people retains its identity in unity with others. While 'sovereignism' involves closing in upon oneself, sovereignty is not, the Pope argued. The Pope stated that sovereignty must be defended and relations with other countries, with the European Community, must also be protected and promoted." This will be addressed as part of Synod on the Amazonia, which involves land in South America that was explored during the Age of Discovery.

== See also ==
- Christianity in China
- Christianity in Japan
- History of the Catholic Church
- List of Spanish missions
- Spanish missions in the Americas
- Discovery doctrine#Advocacy against the doctrine
- Visit by Pope Francis to Canada#Aftermath

== Sources ==
- Monumenta Henricina, (1960–1967), Manuel Lopes de Almeida, Idalino Ferreira da Costa Brochado and Antonio Joaquim
