= Valladolid debate =

16th-century European moral debate

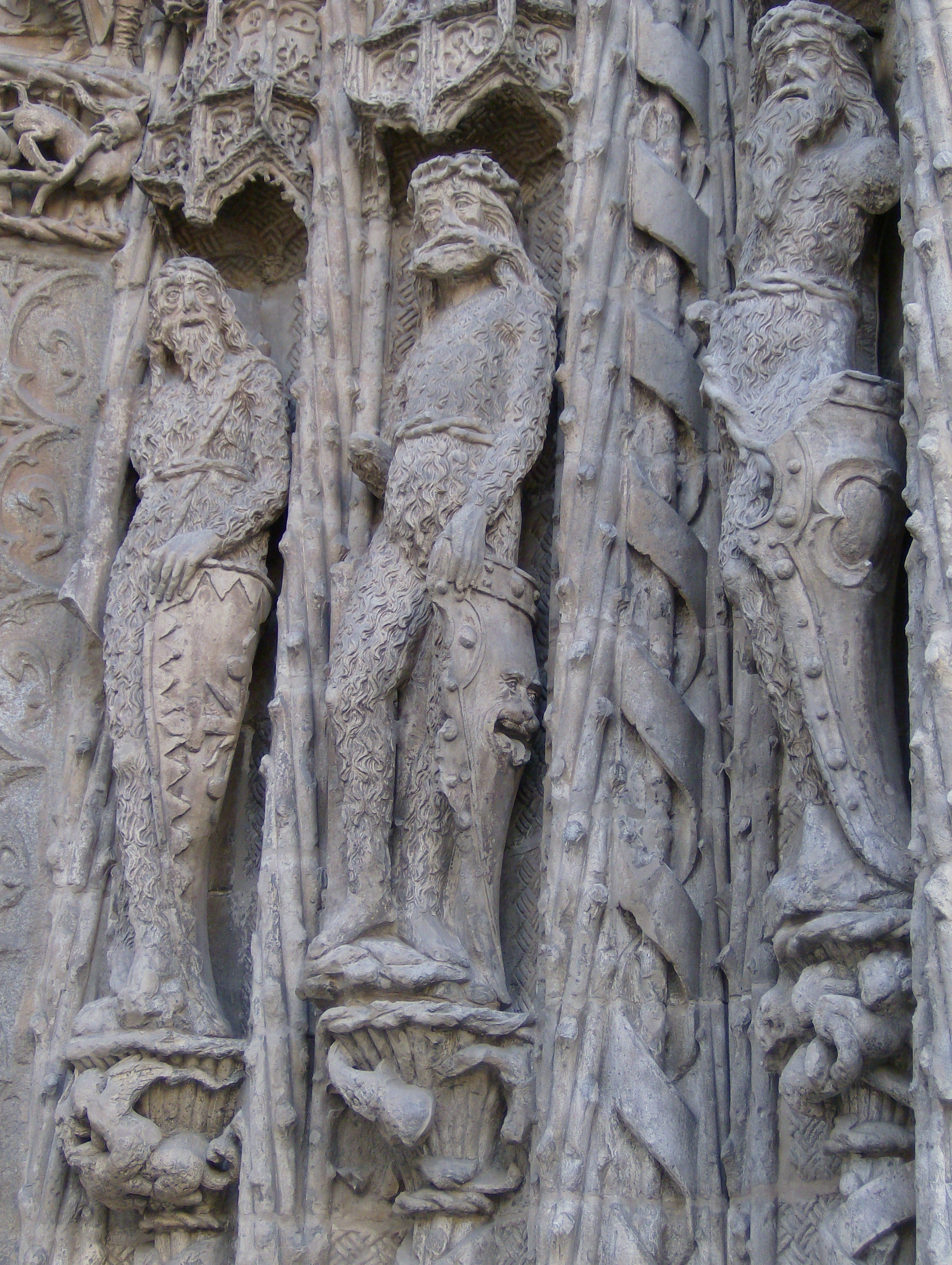
"Wild Men" depicted on the facade of the Colegio de San Gregorio

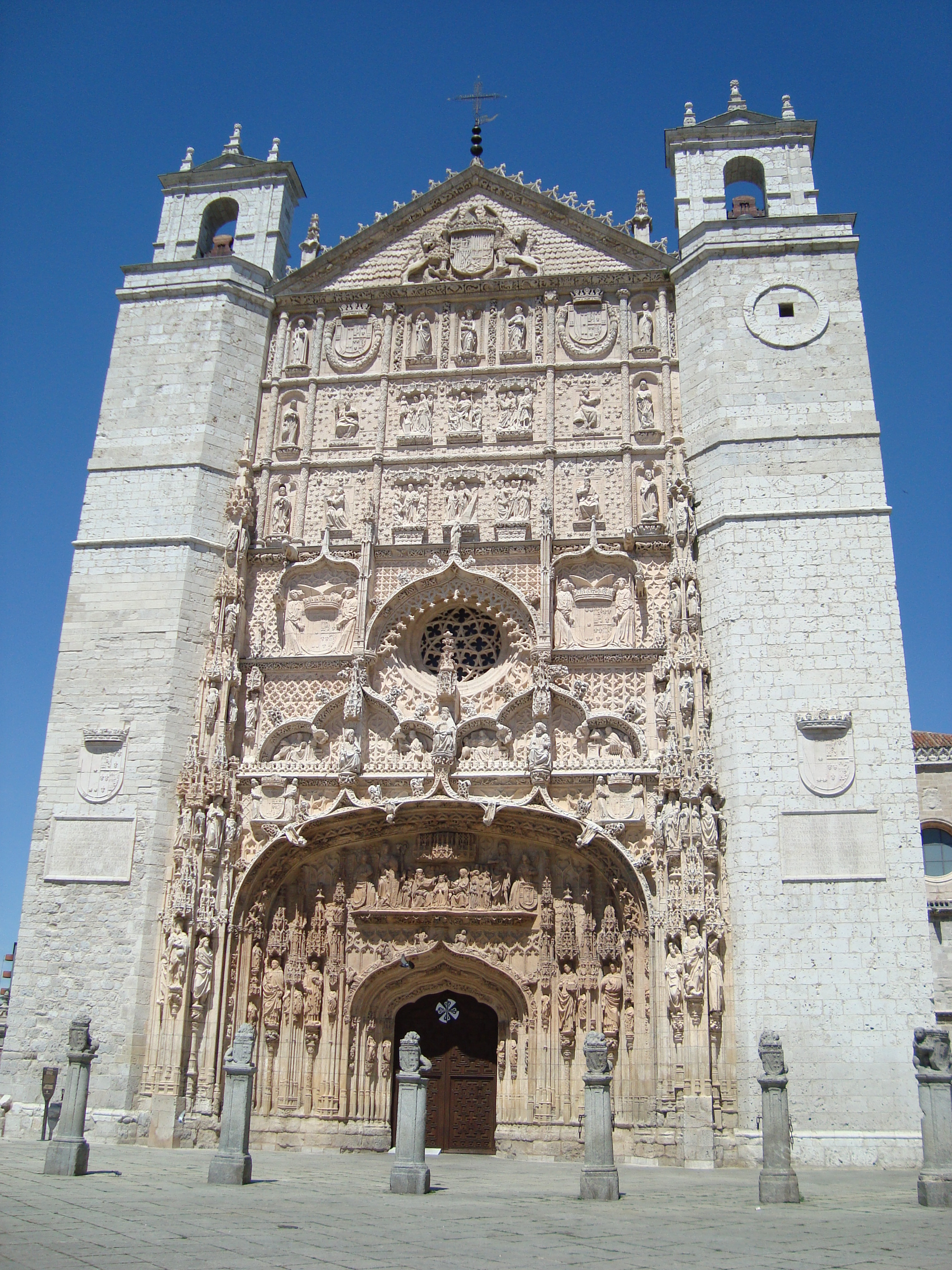
Church of San Pablo, adjacent to Colegio de San Gregorio.

The Valladolid debate (1550–1551; Spanish La Junta de Valladolid or La Controversia de Valladolid) was the first public debate in European history to discuss the morality, rights and treatment of Indigenous people by European colonizers. Held in the Colegio de San Gregorio, in the Spanish city of Valladolid, it was an intellectual and theological debate about the moral legitimacy of the conquest of the Americas, its justification for the conversion to Catholicism, and more specifically about the relations between the European settlers and the natives of the New World. It consisted of a number of opposing views about the way natives were to be integrated into Spanish society, their conversion to Catholicism, and their rights.

Dominican friar and Bishop of Chiapas Bartolomé de las Casas, argued that the Native Americans were free men in the natural order despite their practice of human sacrifices and other such customs, deserving the same consideration as the colonizers. Opposing this view were a number of scholars and priests, including humanist scholar Juan Ginés de Sepúlveda, who argued that the human sacrifice of innocents, cannibalism, and other such "crimes against nature" were unacceptable and should be suppressed by any means possible, including war.

Although both sides claimed to have won the disputation, there is no clear record supporting either interpretation. The affair is considered one of the earliest examples of moral debates about colonialism, human rights of colonized peoples, and international relations. In Spain, it served to establish Las Casas as the primary, though controversial defender of the Indians. He and others had contributed to the passing of the New Laws of 1542, which limited the forced labor encomienda system further. Though they did not fully reverse the situation, the laws achieved considerable improvement in the treatment of Indigenous people in the Americas and consolidated their rights granted by earlier laws.

== Background ==
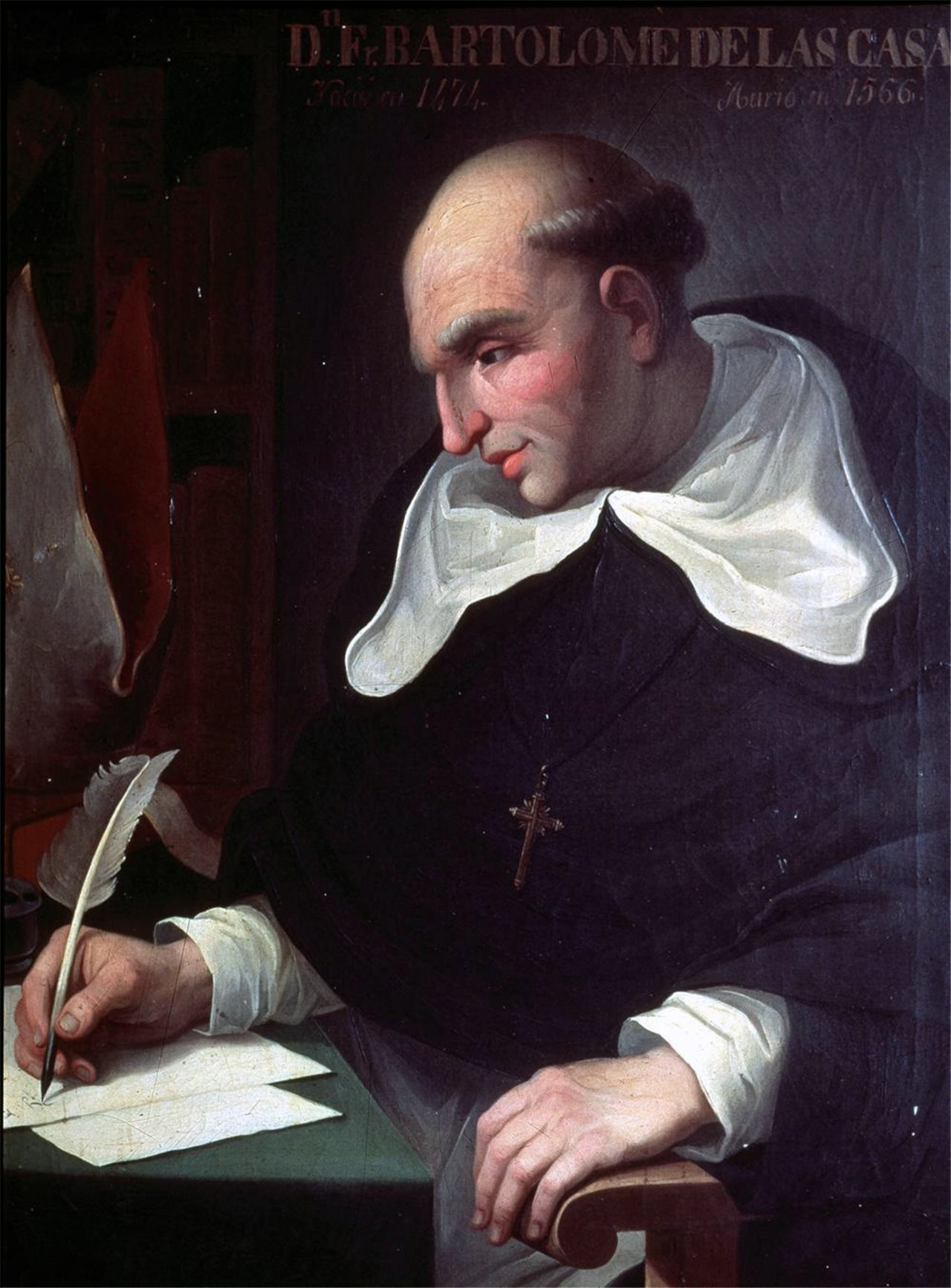
Bartolomé de las Casas was the principal defender of the Indians in the Junta of Valladolid

Spain's colonization and conquest of the Americas inspired an intellectual debate especially regarding the compulsory Christianization of the Indians. Bartolomé de las Casas, a Dominican friar from the School of Salamanca and member of the growing Christian Humanist movement, worked for years to oppose forced conversions and to expose the treatment of Indigenous people in the encomiendas. His efforts influenced the papal bull Sublimis Deus of 1537 which established the status of the Indigenous people as rational beings. More significantly, Las Casas was instrumental in the passage of the New Laws (the Laws of the Indies) of 1542, which were designed to end the encomienda system.

Moved by Las Casas and others, in 1550 the king of Spain Charles I ordered further military expansion to cease until the issue was investigated. The king assembled a Junta (Jury) of eminent doctors and theologians to hear both sides and to issue a ruling on the controversy. Las Casas represented one side of the debate. His position found some support from the monarchy, which wanted to control the power of the encomienderos. Representing the other side was Juan Ginés de Sepúlveda, whose arguments were used as support by colonists and landowners who benefited from the system.

== Debate ==
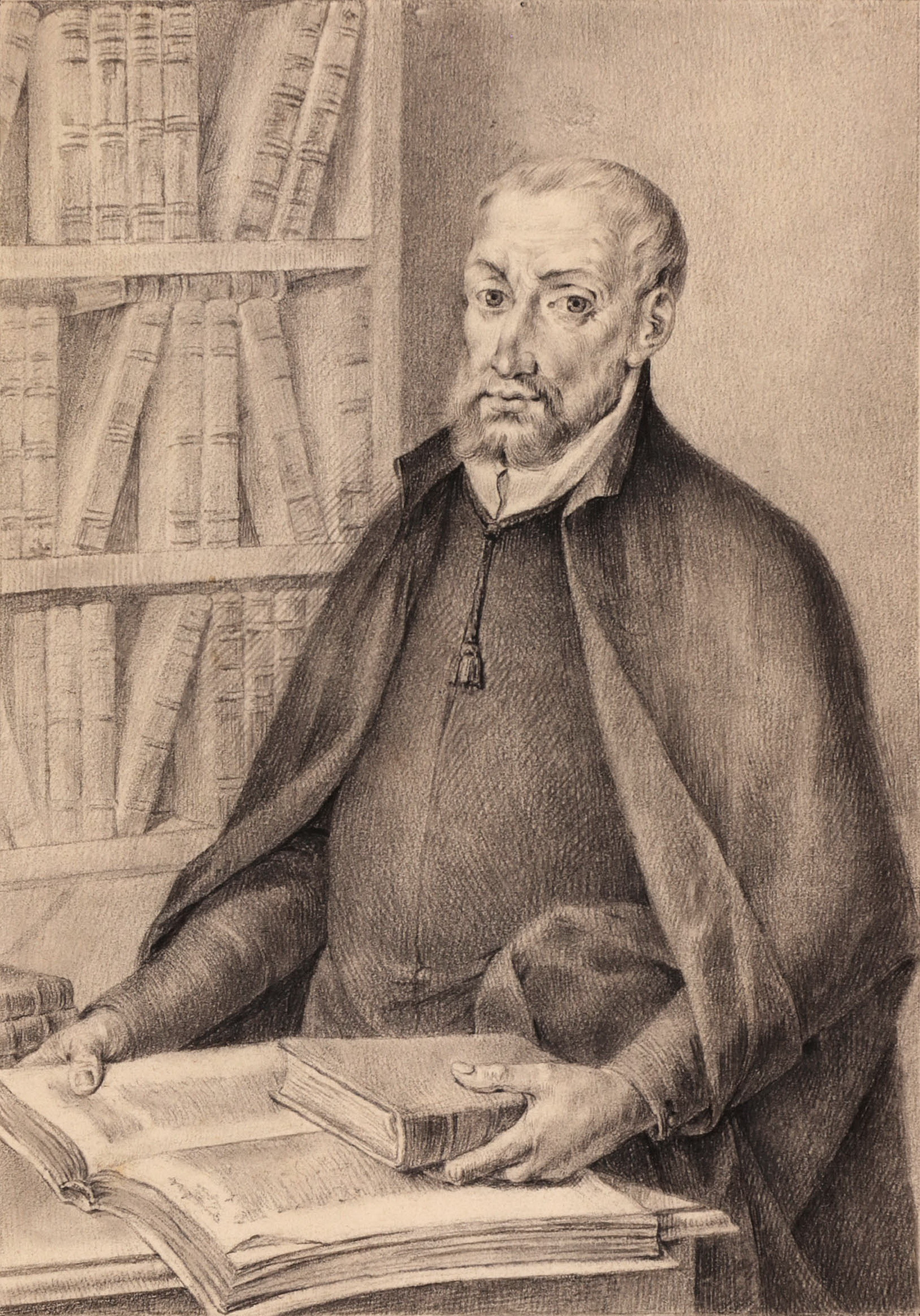
Juan Ginés de Sepúlveda, supporter of the war "jousts" against the Indigenous people

Though Las Casas tried to bolster his position by recounting his experiences with the encomienda system's mistreatment of the Indigenous people, the debate remained on largely theoretical grounds. Sepúlveda took a more secular approach than Las Casas, basing his arguments largely on Aristotle and the Humanist tradition to assert that some Indigenous people were subject to enslavement due to their inability to govern themselves, and could be subdued by war if necessary. Las Casas objected, arguing that Aristotle's definition of the barbarian and natural slave did not apply to Indigenous peoples, all of whom were fully capable of reason and should be brought to Christianity without force or coercion.

Sepúlveda put forward many of the arguments from his Latin dialogue Democrates Alter Sive de Justi Belli Causis, to assert that what he saw as the barbaric traditions of certain Indigenous peoples justified waging war against them. Civilized peoples, according to Sepúlveda, were obliged to punish such vicious practices as idolatry, sodomy, and cannibalism. Wars had to be waged "in order to uproot crimes that offend nature".

Sepúlveda issued four main justifications for just war against certain Indigenous peoples. First, that their natural condition deemed them unable to rule themselves, and it was the responsibility of the Spaniards to act as masters. Second, that Spaniards were entitled to prevent cannibalism as a crime against nature. Third, that the same went for human sacrifice. Fourth, that it was important to convert Indigenous people to Christianity.

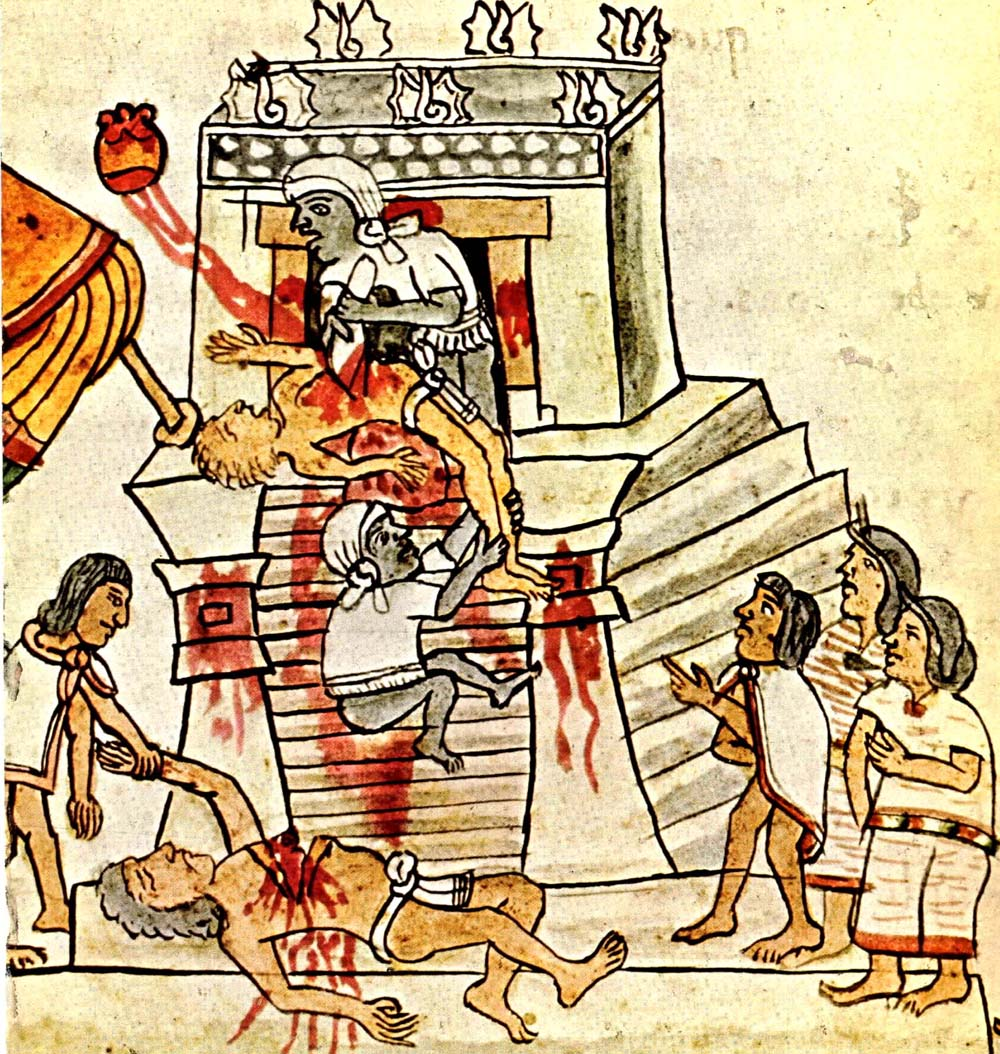
Codex Magliabechiano showing in the same drawing the kind of arguments used by both sides, advanced architecture versus brutal killings

Las Casas was prepared for part of his opponent's discourse, since he, upon hearing about the existence of Sepúlveda's Democrates Alter, had written in the late 1540s his own Latin work, the Apologia, which aimed at debunking his opponent's theological arguments by arguing that Aristotle's definition of the "barbarian" and the natural slave did not apply to Indigenous people who were fully capable of reason and should be brought to Christianity without force.

Las Casas pointed out that every individual was obliged by international law to prevent the innocent from being treated unjustly. He also cited Saint Augustine and Saint John Chrysostom, both of whom had opposed the use of force to bring others to Christian faith. Human sacrifice was wrong, but it would be better to avoid war by any means possible.

The arguments presented by Las Casas and Sepúlveda to the junta of Valladolid remained abstract, with both sides clinging to their opposite theories that relied on similar, if not the same, theoretical authorities, which were interpreted to suit their respective arguments.

== Aftermath ==
At the conclusion of the debates, the judges argued amongst themselves and then scattered without any definite decision. For several years the Council of the Indies pressed the participants to issue an opinion. Apparently, most of the judges wrote their own statements, but these have never been recovered, with the exception of one by the Doctor Anaya, who approved of the conquests in order to spread Christianity and stop certain Indigenous activities viewed as sinful, but added the caveat that the conquests must be undertaken "for the good of the Indians and not for gold." The junta never issued a collective decision.

In the end, while both parties declared that they had won the debate, neither received the outcome they desired. Las Casas did not see the end to Spanish wars of conquest in the New World, and Sepúlveda did not see the New Laws' restrictions on the power of the encomienda system overturned. The debate cemented Las Casas's position as the lead defender of the Indigenous peoples in the Spanish Empire, and further weakened the encomienda system. However, it did not substantially alter Spanish treatment of the Indigenous people in its developing colonies.

Both Sepúlveda and Las Casas maintained their positions long after the end of the debate, but their arguments became less significant when the Spanish presence in the New World became permanent.

Sepúlveda's arguments contributed to the policy of "war by fire and blood" that the Third Mexican Provincial Council implemented in 1585 during the Chichimeca War. According to Lewis Hanke, while Sepúlveda became the hero of the conquistadors, his success was short-lived, and his works were never published in Spain again during his lifetime.

Las Casas's ideas had a more lasting impact on the decisions of the king, Philip II, as well as on history and human rights. Las Casas's criticism of the encomienda system contributed to its replacement with reducciones. His testimonies on the peaceful nature of the Indigenous peoples of the Americas also encouraged nonviolent policies concerning the religious conversions of the Indigenous peoples in New Spain and Peru. It also helped convince more missionaries to come to the Americas to study the indigenous people, such as Bernardino de Sahagún, who learned the native languages to discover more about their cultures and civilizations.

Ultimately, however, the impact of Las Casas's doctrine was also limited. In 1550, the king had ordered that the conquest should cease, because the Valladolid debate was to decide whether the war was just or not. But the government's orders were hardly respected: conquistadors such as Pedro de Valdivia went on to wage war in Chile during the first half of the 1550s. Expanding Spanish territory in the New World was allowed again in May 1556, and a decade later, Spain began its conquest of the Philippines.

=== Modern reception ===
In recent years, the Valladolid debate has been noted for its role (albeit marginal) in the conception of international politics in the sixteenth-century. Las Casas's ethical arguments offer a reflection on the question of jurisdiction, asking whether law can be applied internationally, especially in so-called 'rogue states'.

The debate also holds a place in contemporary just war theory, as scholars aim to expand jus ad bellum within war studies.

== Reflection in art ==
In 1938 the story of the German writer Reinhold Schneider Las Casas and Charles V (Las Casas vor Karl V.) was published.

In 1992 the Valladolid debate became an inspiration source for Jean-Claude Carrière who published the novel La Controverse de Valladolid (Dispute in Valladolid). The novel was filmed in French for television under the same name. The director was Jean-Danielle Veren, with Jean-Pierre Marielle playing Las Casas and Jean-Louis Trintignant acting as Sepúlveda.

Carrière's work was later was staged as a play in 1999 at the Theatre de l'Atelier in Paris. It was later translated into English, and performed at The Public Theater in New York City in 2005, and in Spokane, Washington in 2019.

== See also ==
- Catholic Church and the Age of Discovery
- Sublimis Deus
