= Romanus Pontifex =

Various 1400s papal bulls on slavery

Romanus Pontifex (from Latin: "The Roman Pontiff") is a papal bull issued in 1455 by Nicholas V. It praises Catholic King Afonso V of Portugal for his battles against the Muslims, endorsing his military expeditions into Western Africa and instructing him to capture and subdue all Saracens, Turks, and other non-Christians to reduce their persons to perpetual slavery. The Church leaders argued that slavery served as a natural deterrent and Christianizing influence to "barbarous" behavior among pagans. As a follow-up to the bull Dum Diversas, the church leaders now took positions aside the Crown of Portugal that it was entitled to dominion over all lands south of Cape Bojador in Africa. The bull's primary purpose was to forbid other Christian kings from infringing the King of Portugal's practice of trade and colonisation in these regions, particularly amid the Portuguese and Castilian competition for ascendancy over new lands discovered.

== Background ==
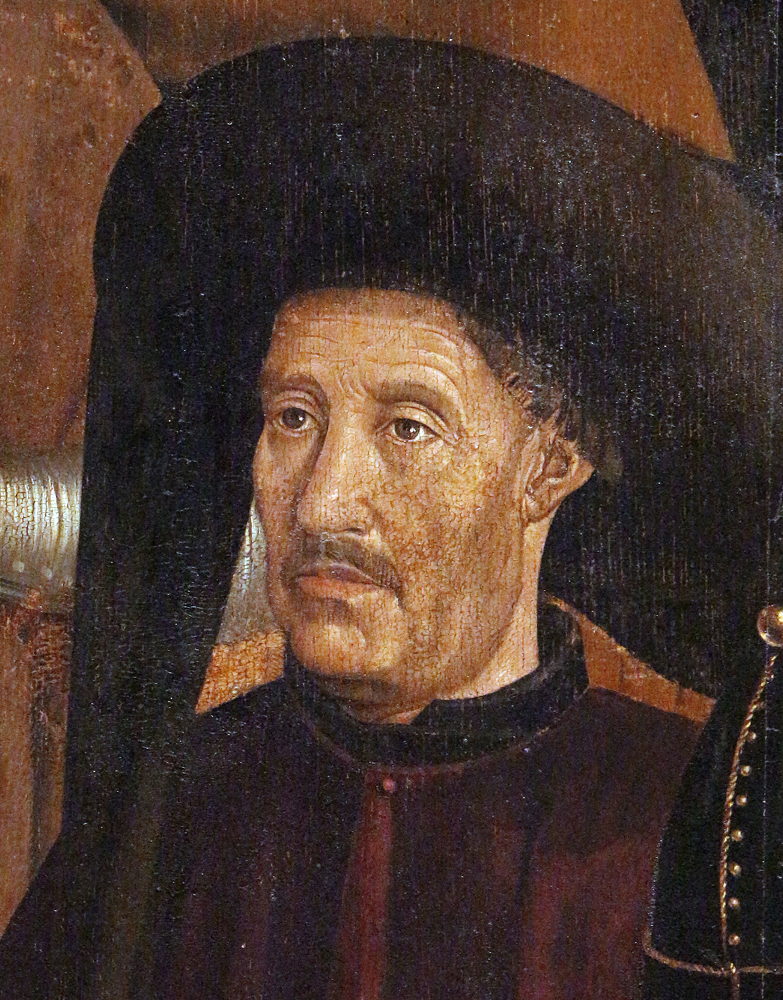
Henry the Navigator

Around 1312 Genoese navigator Lancelotto Malocello discovered the Canary Islands. The Portuguese travelled there in 1341 both to trade and raid. By 1346 slave raiding was occurring. However, the first attempt at permanent colonization was sponsored by the Castilians in 1402. During the 14th century, a variety of forces competed for control of the Canaries: Genoese, Catalan-Mallorcan, Castilian, and Portuguese. In the following century, Castile and Portugal were the primary contenders.

In the early 15th century the Portuguese searched for a sea route to India to participate in the spice trade. As a first step, Prince Henry the Navigator launched expeditions to explore the West Coast of Africa. This experience exerted a deep impression so that his reign later on was marked by an ambitious expansion that resulted in exploratory achievements. It led, however, to disputes between the Portuguese and the Castilians regarding control along the African coast. As an independent third party, the pope would, on occasion, be asked to arbitrate disputes between kingdoms. On January 5, 1443, in the papal bull Rex regum, Eugenius IV had taken a neutral position on the disputed claims of Castile and Portugal over territory in Africa.

== History ==
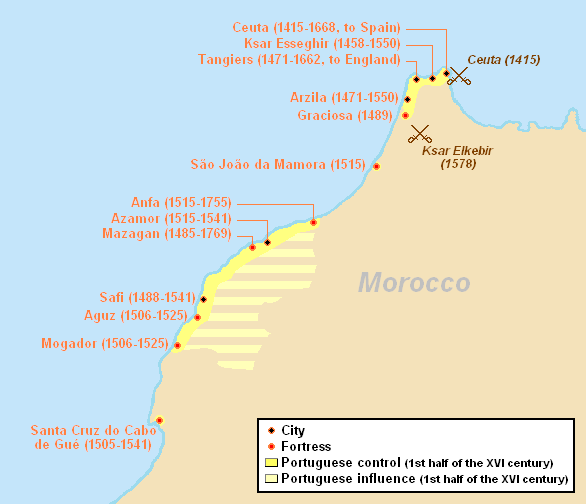
Portuguese possessions in north-west Africa (1415–1769)

It was not until Afonso V of Portugal responded to a papal call for aid against the Turks, who eventually seized Constantinople in 1453, that Pope Nicholas V supported the Portuguese claims in the bull Dum Diversas.

Nonetheless, in 1454 a fleet of caravels from Seville and Cádiz traded along the African coast and upon their return were intercepted by a Portuguese squadron. One of the ships was captured with crew and cargo taken to Portugal. Enrique IV of Castile threatened war. Afonso V appealed to the pope for moral support of Portugal's right to a monopoly of trade in lands she discovered.

The bull, issued in January 1455, endorsed Portuguese possession of Ceuta (which they already held) and the exclusive right to trade, navigation, and fishing in the discovered lands. It provided an exemption from a canon law prohibition on trading with infidels.

== Content ==
The bull praises earlier Portuguese victories against the Muslims of North Africa and the success of expeditions of discovery and conquest to the Azores and to Africa south of Cape Bojador. It also repeats earlier injunctions not to supply items useful in war such as weaponry, iron or timber to either Muslims or non-Christians. In Dum Diversas, the European trade with Muslims was strictly prohibited but Romanus Pontifex gave the King of Portugal an exception, provided that the trade did not include iron, weapons, and wood for building. Overall, there were the threats of ecclesiastical punishments, including excommunication and interdiction, for those who violate the provisions of the papal grant.

The substance of the Bull's articles are as follows:

The Roman pontiff, successor of the key-bearer of the heavenly kingdom and vicar of Jesus Christ, contemplating with a father's mind all the several climes of the world and the characteristics of all the nations dwelling in them and seeking and desiring the salvation of all, wholesomely ordains and disposes upon careful deliberation those things which he sees will be agreeable to the Divine Majesty and by which he may bring the sheep entrusted to him by God into the single divine fold, and may acquire for them the reward of eternal felicity, and obtain pardon for their souls. This we believe will more certainly come to pass, through the aid of the Lord, if we bestow suitable favors and special graces on those Catholic kings and princes, who, like athletes and intrepid champions of the Christian faith, as we know by the evidence of facts, not only restrain the savage excesses of the Saracens and of other infidels, enemies of the Christian name, but also for the defense and increase of the faith vanquish them and their kingdoms and habitations, though situated in the remotest parts unknown to us, and ...

the said infante ... believing that he would best perform his duty to God in this matter, if by his effort and industry that sea might become navigable as far as to the Indians who are said to worship the name of Christ, and that thus he might be able to enter into relation with them, and to incite them to aid the Christians against the Saracens ...

... to conserve their right and possession, [the said king and infante] under certain most severe penalties then expressed, have prohibited and in general have ordained that none, unless with their sailors and ships and on payment of a certain tribute and with an express license previously obtained from the said king or infante, should presume to sail to the said provinces or to trade in their ports or to fish in the sea,

... since we had formerly by other letters of ours granted among other things free and ample faculty to the aforesaid King Alfonso – to invade, search out, capture, vanquish, and subdue all Saracens and pagans whatsoever, and other enemies of Christ wheresoever placed, and the kingdoms, dukedoms, principalities, dominions, possessions, and all movable and immovable goods whatsoever held and possessed by them and to reduce their persons to perpetual slavery, and to apply and appropriate to himself and his successors the kingdoms, dukedoms, counties, principalities, dominions, possessions, and goods, and to convert them to his and their use and profit – by having secured the said faculty, the said King Alfonso, or, by his authority, the aforesaid infante, justly and lawfully has acquired and possessed, and doth possess, these islands, lands, harbors, and seas, and they do of right belong and pertain to the said King Alfonso and his successors, nor without special license from King Alfonso and his successors themselves has any other even of the faithful of Christ been entitled hitherto, nor is he by any means now entitled lawfully to meddle therewith.

== Effect ==
King Afonso V gave a ceremonial lecture on the bull in Lisbon Cathedral on October 5, 1455, to inform the foreign representatives of commerce. With the bull the Portuguese had a monopoly for trade in the new areas in Africa and Asia. It also served as the legal basis for boarding foreign ships in that area. Historian Stephen Bown notes that "Prince Henry and King Afonso V had now also shrouded Portuguese commercial activities in a cloak of pious devotion to the church's work". Along with the right of conquest, Romanus Pontifex effectively made the Portuguese king and his representatives the church's direct agents of ecclesiastical administration and expansion. The Portuguese authorities sent to colonise lands were not only commanded to build churches, monasteries, and holy places, but also authorized to

send over to them any ecclesiastical persons whatsoever, as volunteers, both seculars, and regulars of any of the mendicant orders (with license, however, from their superiors), and that those persons may abide there as long as they shall live, and hear confessions of all who live in the said parts or who come thither, and after the confessions have been heard they may give due absolution in all cases, except those reserved to the aforesaid see, and enjoin salutary penance, and also administer the ecclesiastical sacraments freely and lawfully ...

This authority to appoint missioners was granted to Afonso and his successors.

=== Colonialism ===
In 1493 Pope Alexander VI issued the bull Inter caetera stating one Christian nation did not have the right to establish dominion over lands previously dominated by another Christian nation. Together, the bulls Dum Diversas and Romanus Pontifex, along with Inter Caetera, have been interpreted as serving as a justification for the Age of Imperialism. They were also early influences on the development of the slave trade of the 15th and 16th centuries, even though the papal bull Sublimis Deus of 1537 forbade the enslavement of non-Christians. The executive brief for Sublimis Deus was withdrawn by the Pope after protests by the Spanish monarchy. Pope Paul III publicly sanctioned slavery in Rome in 1545, the enslavement of Englishmen who supported Henry VIII after he had been excommunicated, and the purchase of Muslim slaves in 1548.

Norman Housley observes that "it would be unfair to criticize the papal court exclusively for its failure to be more discriminating in its grants or to take more frequently the kind of action which Eugenius IV adopted in 1454 over the Canaries." The idea of discovery, and the conversion and enslavement that accompanied it, were identified with hard-held concepts of crusade and chivalry at that time.

=== United States ===
In the 1823 case Johnson v. McIntosh Chief Justice John Marshall found in favor of a "universal recognition" of a so-called discovery doctrine that held that discovery gave title to the government by whose subjects, or by whose authority, it was made, against all other European governments, which title might be consummated by possession.

Spain did not rest her title solely on the grant of the Pope. Her discussions respecting boundary, with France, with Great Britain, and with the United States, all show that she placed it on the rights given by discovery. Portugal sustained her claim to the Brazils by the same title.

Most of the opinion is dicta; thus, all that the opinion holds with respect to aboriginal title is that it is inalienable, a principle that remains well-established law in nearly all common law jurisdictions.

This decision was upheld in the 1831 case Cherokee Nation v. Georgia, giving Georgia authority to extend state laws over Cherokees within the state, and famously describing Native American tribes as "domestic dependent nations". This decision was modified in Worcester v. Georgia, which stated that the U.S. federal government, and not individual states, had authority in Indian affairs, but it maintained the loss of right to title upon discovery by Europeans.

In recent years, Native American groups including the Taíno and Onondaga have called on the Vatican to revoke the bulls of 1452, 1455, and 1493. The Haudenosaunee countered the papal bulls with the Two Row Wampum conditionally accepting the bulls, stating through the two row wampum: "You say that you are our Father and I am your Son. We will not be like Father and Son, but like Brothers. This wampum belt confirms our words ... Neither of us will make compulsory laws or interfere in the internal affairs of the other. Neither of us will try to steer the other's vessel."

=== Mission ===
After Vasco da Gama found the sea route to India in 1498, the Portuguese practiced trading for four centuries. Portuguese clerics were only responsible for the needs of the Portuguese, and clerics of other nations were not allowed to operate in Portuguese India.

In Goa, envoys of the Pope were arrested and sent back to Portugal.

== See also ==
- Conquest of the Canary Islands
- Creator Omnium
- Catholic Church and the Age of Discovery

== Bibliography ==
- Daus, Ronald (1983). Die Erfindung des Kolonialismus. Wuppertal/Germany: Hammer. ISBN 3-87294-202-6.
- Panzer, Joel S. The Popes and Slavery, New York : Alba House, 1996. ISBN 0-8189-0764-9 Review
