= Pastorale officium =

Pastorale officium Latin for 'Pastoral office' Papal brief of Pope Paul III
- Signature date: 29 May 1537
- Subject: Prohibition of enslaving Indigenous people of the Americas

Pastorale officium is an apostolic brief issued by Pope Paul III, May 29, 1537, to Cardinal Juan Pardo de Tavera which declares that anyone who enslaved or despoiled indigenous Americans would be automatically excommunicated.

The harsh threat of punishment (Latae sententiae) contained in Pastorale officium made the conquistadors complain to the Spanish king and Emperor. Charles V went on to argue that the letter was injurious to the Imperial right of colonization and harmful to the peace of the Indies. The urging of Charles V to revoke the briefs and bulls of 1537 exemplifies the tension of the concern for evangelisation as manifested in the teachings of 1537 and the pressure to honor the system of royal patronage. The weakened position of the pope and the memory of the 1527 Sack of Rome a decade earlier by imperial troops made the ecclesiastical authorities hesitant in engaging in any possible confrontation with the Emperor. Under mounting pressure, Pope Paul III succumbed and removed the ecclesiastical censures in the 1538 letter entitled Non Indecens Videtur.

The annulling of the ecclesiastical letter was not a denial of the doctrinal teaching of the spiritual equivalence of all human beings, although the 1538 annulment came a year after the papal encyclical Sublimis Deus, which was promulgated by Pope Paul III on June 2, 1537. Thus the Pastorale officium has been seen as a companion document for the encyclical Sublimis Deus.

== See also ==
- Catholic Church and the Age of Discovery
