= Laws of Burgos =

First codified set of laws governing Spaniards in the Americas (1512–42)

The Laws of Burgos (Spanish: Leyes de Burgos), promulgated on 27 December 1512 in Burgos, Crown of Castile (Spain), was the first codified set of laws governing the behavior of Spaniards in the Americas, particularly with regard to the Indigenous people of the Americas ("native Caribbean Indians"). They forbade the slavery of the Indigenous people and endorsed their conversion to Catholicism. The laws were created following the conquest and Spanish colonization of the Americas in the West Indies, where the common law of Castile was not fully applicable. Friars and Spanish academics pressured King Ferdinand II of Aragon and his daughter, Queen regnant, Joanna of Castile, to pass the set of laws in order to protect the rights of the natives of the New World.

The scope of the laws was originally restricted to the island of Hispaniola but was later extended to the islands of Puerto Rico and Santiago, later renamed Jamaica. These laws authorized and legalized the colonial practice of creating encomiendas, where Indians were grouped together to work under a colonial head of the estate for a salary, and limited the size of these establishments to between 40 and 150 people. They also established a minutely regulated regime of work, pay, provisioning, living quarters, and diet. Women more than four months pregnant were exempted from heavy labor.

The document also prohibited the use of any form of punishment by the encomenderos, reserving it for officials established in each town for the implementation of the laws. It also ordered that the Indians be catechized, outlawed bigamy, and required that the huts and cabins of the Indians be built together with those of the Spanish. It respected, in some ways, the traditional authorities, granting chiefs exemptions from ordinary jobs and granting them various Indians as servants.

They were later amended as the Laws of Valladolid in the following year, 1513.

The limited fulfillment of the laws sometimes led to protests and claims. Sometimes they were seen as a legalization of the previously poorer situation, which created momentum for reform, later carried out through the Leyes Nuevas ("New Laws") in 1542, a new set of stricter regulations about life in the New World including the rights of Indigenous peoples, as well as the Laws of the Indies, to encompass the Papal bull and all edicts.

Generally, these laws are considered to be precursors of the declaration of human rights and international law, although some scholars criticize their lack of implementation and some of its policies.

== Origins ==
Cardinal Archbishop Domingo de Mendoza of Seville heard reports of the abuse of the Americas' Indians and sent a group of Dominican missionaries to Hispaniola to stop the maltreatment. They could not legally stop it, but missionaries made complaints and stirred up a debate that the settlers feared would make them lose their property interests; Fray Antonio de Montesinos preached to the colonists that they were sinning and did not have the right to force the Indians to serve them, claiming they should only be converted to Christianity.

The colonists disagreed and decided the best way to protect their interests was to come together as a group and choose a Franciscan Friar named Alonso de Espinal to present their case to King Ferdinand II of Aragon and his daughter Queen Joanna of Castile, the co-rulers of Spain, and refute Montesinos's accusations. The colonists' plan backfired, though, and Spain was outraged by the cases of maltreatment of the Indians. To solve the moral and legal question, the rulers commissioned a group of theologians and academics to come up with a solution.

Dominican Friars, under the sponsorship of Diego de Deza, supported the scientific examination of Christopher Columbus's claims for exploring the West that Columbus presented to then Queen of Castile, Isabel I of Castile and her husband, King of Aragon Ferdinand II of Aragon. After 1508, the friars made the case to defend the aboriginal American Indians from becoming serfs or slaves of the new colonists.

The friars and other Spanish academics pressured King Ferdinand II of Aragon and his daughter, now the ruling Queen of Castile, Joanna I of Castile, to pass a set of laws to protect the rights of the natives of the New World, which were to become the 1512 Laws of Burgos. In Burgos, on 27 December 1512, thirty-five laws were put into effect to secure the freedom of the Indigenous peoples of the Americas and to enforce Indian Reductions rules governing conversions. The laws acted as the first codified legal code for the Spanish Indies, and was the first of many successive laws aimed at reducing exploitation of the Indigenous population.

== Summary ==
It declared that the Indians are free people; that they ought to be instructed in the Christian faith; that they might be ordered to work, but so that their working should not hinder their conversion, and should be such as they could endure; that they should have cottages and lands of their own, and time to work for themselves; that they should hold communication with the Christians; and that they should receive wages, not paid in money, but in clothes and furniture for their cottages.

In total there were 35 laws promulgated by the Burgos document in 1512, summarized as follows:

1. The Indians are to be moved to encomiendas. For every fifty Indians, four lodges shall be built (thirty by fifteen feet). This land cannot be taken from them since they were taken from their original land. The Indians will do the planting of all of the food. During the proper seasons, the encomenderos (men looking over the Indians) will have the Indians plant corn and raise the hens.
2. The Indians will leave their land voluntarily to come to the encomiendas so that they shall not suffer from being removed by force.
3. The citizen to whom the Indians are given must erect a structure to be used as a church. In the church must be a picture of Our Lady and a bell with which to call the Indians to prayer time. The person who has them in the encomienda must go with them to church every night and make sure they cross themselves and sing several hymns. If an Indian does not come to the church, he is not allowed to rest the next day.
4. To make sure the Indians are learning Christianity properly, they shall be tested every two weeks and taught what they do not know by the Encomendero. He shall teach them the Ten Commandments, the Seven Deadly Sins, and the Articles of Faith. Any encomendero that does not do this properly will be fined six gold pesos.
5. A church will be built equidistant from all estates. On Sundays, Mass shall be observed and a feast will be eaten. If the encomendero does not bring his Indians, he will be charged ten gold pesos.
6. If the church is too far away, another will be built.
7. The priests who collect tithes from the estates must have priests continually in the churches of the estates.
8. There shall be churches built at the mines so that the Indians working the mines may hear mass on Sundays.
9. Whoever has fifty Indians must choose one boy who the encomendero thinks is able, to be taught to read and write, and also the importance of Catholicism. This boy will then teach the other Indians because the Indians would more readily accept what the boy says than what the Spaniards says. If the encomendero has one hundred Indians, two boys shall be chosen. The faith must be ingrained into their heads so the souls of the Indians are saved.
10. If an Indian falls sick near where there is a priest, the priest must go to him and recite the Credo and other profitable things of the Catholic faith. The Indian shall make confession without being charged a fee. If the Indian is to die, he shall be buried with a cross near the church. If he is not buried, the encomendero owes a fine of four gold pesos.
11. The Indians must not be used as carriers for transporting things to the Indians at the mines.
12. All Spanish inhabitants who have Indians in an encomienda must have the infants baptized within a week of their birth.
13. After the Indians have been brought to the estates, gold shall be searched for as follows: Indians in an encomienda must search for gold for five months a year and at the end of the five months are allowed to rest for forty days. During the forty days, the Indians are not to be employed, unless they are a slave and accept to plant the crops. During the forty days, the Indians will be further instructed in faith since they have more time to learn.
14. The Indians must be allowed to perform their sacred dances.
15. All citizens who have Indians are required to feed them breads, yams, peppers, and on Sundays feed them dishes of cooked meat. For every offense, a fine of two gold pesos shall be paid.
16. According to Catholicism, the Indians are not allowed to have more than one wife at a time and they are not allowed to abandon their wives.
17. Sons of the chiefs of the Islands who are under the age of thirteen are to be given to the Friars so they can be taught how to read, write, and other things about Catholicism. When the sons reach the age of nineteen, they are to return to the encomienda and teach the others.
18. Pregnant women are not to be sent to the mines or made to plant the crops. They shall be kept on the estate and made to do household duties such as cooking and weeding. After the child is born, she can nurse it until it is three years old. After this time, she can return to the mines and other duties.
19. The Indians should not sleep on the ground. Each encomendero should provide his Indians with hammocks.
20. The Indians are to be given one gold peso every year to pay for clothing.
21. Indians may not change their masters. One encomendero cannot employ or house an Indian belonging to another encomendero.
22. The Indian chiefs are allowed two Indians to perform personal duties for every forty of their subjects. Also, visitors to the estates must treat the Indians well and teach them what they know of Catholicism.
23. Official inspectors must keep records of the activities and also the treatment of the Indians in the encomiendas. They must keep track of the population and how much gold is being mined.
24. The Indians are not to be physically or verbally abused for any reason.
25. The Indians are not to be used in private trade or for any other economic interest.
26. Encomenderos that have their Indians working in distant mines shall combine efforts with other estates to help provide food for the Indians.
27. Indians from other lands must also be taught the things of the Catholic faith. They are to be treated kindly, unless they are slaves.
28. If an encomendero dies, his successor takes control of the Indians.
29. Two inspectors should be appointed to each Estate.
30. The inspectors are to be chosen by the Admiral, judges, and officers. These people should be compensated by being given Indians in encomienda.
31. Villages should be inspected two times a year, once in the beginning of the year, and once in the summer.
32. If there is a runaway Indian, inspectors cannot apprehend them. They must be given to a man of good conscience who will find the Indians' encomendero.
33. All inspectors should hold a copy of the Laws of Burgos, signed by the Governor.
34. Inspectors must be provided residences.
35. One person may not have more than one hundred and fifty Indians and no less than forty Indians in encomienda at one time.

Amendments were added to the Laws of Burgos on 28 July 1513.

1. Indian women married to Indian men are not to be forced to serve with their husbands at the mines or anywhere else unless it is by their own free will or unless their husbands wish to take them.
2. Indian children do not have to do the work of adults until the reach the age of fourteen. They are then made to do the tasks of children, like weeding or working in their parents' estates.
3. Unmarried Indian women who are under the authority of their parents have to work with them on their lands. Those not under the authority of their parents must be kept apart so they do not become vagabonds.
4. After two years of service, the Indians are free to go. By this time they will be civilized and proper Christians, able to govern themselves.

== Results ==
Bartolomé de Las Casas believed that the New World was granted to Spain and Portugal solely for the conversion of the Native residents. The Indians, he believed, should not be used for other purposes, especially not for profit. The only solution was to remove the presence of the Spanish colonists from the Indians, except for practising missionaries.

On 28 July 1513, four more laws were added in what is known today as Leyes Complementarias de Valladolid 1513, three related to Indian women and Indian children and another more related to Indian males. They were operational till 17 November 1526, when the so-called Ordenanzas de Granada 1526 came effective. These new amended laws reflected the theological and political disputes among the Spanish theologians, and the intervention of the Popes including their advisers.

They had been under consideration since the creation of the Council of the Indies, March 1523, by king Charles I of Spain, the son of Queen Joanna I of Castile, whose first president was Dominican friar Juan García de Loaysa (1478–1546), Cardinal since 1530 and Archbishop of Seville, 1539 – 1546.

The later "Ordenanzas de Granada," 1526, were discussed mainly between king Charles I of Spain and "Licenciado" Rodrigo de Figueroa as a consequence of the extensive Institutional Battling promoted by famous Dominican Father Bartolomé de las Casas, an offspring of a merchant family from Seville, dealing in the past with black African slaves brought to the Caribbean islands, apparently, since no earlier than 1501, borrowing perhaps, in some cases, the sociological views on "evangelization" of renowned Scottish Professor at University of Paris, c. 1510, John Mair, (1467–1550).

== See also ==
- Catholic Church and the Age of Discovery
- Indigenous peoples of the Americas
- Spanish colonization of the Americas
- Sublimis Deus

== Sources ==
English

- Bakewell, Peter. "1512-1513. The Laws of Burgos". Southern Methodist University. Archived from the original on 6 June 2019.
- Hanke, Lewis (1949). The Spanish Struggle for Justice in the Conquest of America (1959 ed.). Philadelphia: University of Pennsylvania Press. pp. 23–25.
- Hussey, Ronald D. (1932). "Text of the Laws of Burgos (1512-1513) Concerning the Treatment of the Indians". The Hispanic American Historical Review. 12 (3): 301–326. doi:10.2307/2506673. JSTOR 2506673.
- Simpson, Lesley Byrd (1950). The Encomienda of New Spain (1982 Reprint ed.). University of California Press. pp. 29–38. ISBN 0520046307.
- Thomas, Hugh (2003). Rivers of Gold. New York: Random House. pp. 296-300. ISBN 0375502041.
- Williams, Robert A. (1990). The American Indian in Western Legal Thought: the Discourses of Conquest. New York: Oxford University Press. pp. 86-88. ISBN 0195050223.

Spanish

- Pedro FERNANDEZ RODRIGUEZ. "los dominicos en el contexto de la primera evangelizacion de Mexico, (1526–1550)", Salamanca, Edit. San Esteban, 308 pages, (1994),
- A. MORO OREJON. "Ordenanzas reales sobre los Indios, (Las Leyes de 1512–1513)". Anuario de Estudios Americanos, 13, (1956), pp 317 – 371.
- R. KONETZKE. Coleccion de Documentos para la Historia de la Formacion Social de Hispano-America, 1493–1810, Vol. 1, 1493–1592, Madrid, C.S.I.C., (1953).
- R. ALTAMIRA. "El texto de las Leyes de Burgos de 1512". Rev. de Historia de America, 4, (1938), pages 6 – 79.
- V. D. CARRO. "La Teologia y los Teologos-Juristas Españoles en la Conquista de America", Madrid, C.S.I.C., 2 vols, (1944). 2nd edition, Salamanca, (1951).
