= Robert Jaulin =

French ethnologist

Robert Jaulin (7 March 1928, Le Cannet, Alpes-Maritimes – 22 November 1996, Grosrouvre) was a French ethnologist. After several journeys to Chad, between 1954 and 1959, among the Sara people, he published in 1967 La Mort Sara (The Sara Death) in which he exposed the various initiation rites through which he had passed himself, and closely analyzed Sara geomancy. In La Paix blanche (The White peace, 1970), he redefined the notion of ethnocide in relation to the extermination by the Western world of the Bari culture, located between Venezuela and Colombia. As genocide designs the physical extermination of a people, an ethnocide refers to the extermination of a culture.

== Life ==
Jaulin has given particular attention to phenomenons of acculturation and highlight the importance of cultural relativism in order to respect other cultures. Although he was part of the humanist tradition of universalism seen through a multiculturalist viewpoint, he opposed a universalist method of ethnology which would try to abstract general laws from the study of particular societies — targeting in particular structuralism, preferring, on Malinowski's steps, to immerge himself in one specific culture and closely describe it. In this aim, he theorized a specific approach to ethnology, dubbed in 1985 ethnologie pariseptiste by Yves Lecerf in an attempt to describe Jaulin's teachings at the University of Paris-VII since May '68.

Jaulin signed the Manifeste des 121 opposed to the use of torture during the Algerian War (1954–62). After a journey among the Bari in South America, he called for a convention on ethnocide in the Americas at the Congress of Americanists, and in February, 1970, the French Society of Americanists convened for that purpose. Jaulin criticized in particular the role of Christian missionaries towards non-Western cultures.

In 1970, he created at the University of Paris-VII the first department dedicated to ethnology, anthropology and science of religions, to which participated scholars such as the philosopher Jean-Toussaint Desanti, Pierre Bernard, Bernard Delfendahl, Serge Moscovici, Jean Rouch, Michel de Certeau, etc.

== The concept of ethnocide ==
Jaulin redefined the concept of ethnocide in 1970 with his ground-breaking La paix blanche : introduction à l’ethnocide ("White Peace: Introduction to Ethnocide"). This capital work, which remains to be translated into English, gives a detailed account of the ethnocide-in-motion suffered by the Bari, an Indian people living on the border between Venezuela and Colombia, in the second half of the sixties, as witnessed by Jaulin himself. Whether conflicting or collaborating among themselves, multiple vectors of ethnocide in place (the Catholic Church and other Christian confessions, the Venezuelan and the Colombian armies, the American oil company Colpet, and all the “little colonists” as Jaulin calls them) converged to the relentless disavowal and destruction of Bari's culture and society.

In Jaulin's understanding of the notion, it is not the means but the ends that define ethnocide. Accordingly, the ethnocide would be the systematic destruction of the thought or culture and the way of life of people different from those who carry out this enterprise of destruction. Whereas the genocide assassinates the people in their body, the ethnocide kills them in their spirit and culture.

Collective and arbitrary murder, systematic abduction of children to raise them away from their parent's culture, active and degrading religious propaganda, forced work, expulsion from the homeland or compulsory abandonment of cultural habits and social structure, all these practices, described by Jaulin, have in common a deep despise for the other man and woman as representatives of a different cultural world.

Along with a detailed description and analysis of Bari's case, La paix blanche is also a broad reflection on Western civilization’s tendency to disacknowledge, lower and destroy other cultural worlds as it comes in touch with them, while extending its own domain, bringing the focus of the discussion back from the frontiers of Western civilization to its core and its history. As he takes his inquiry back in time, Jaulin shows that the way the West relates to other civilizations is a continuation of the way it has always related to its own inner cultural diversity, from the monotheistic exclusion of the representatives of different and differing cultural spaces (the “other” gods, divinities, entities, etc.) to its reinstatement under the successive garments of Reason, Revolution, Progress or Science.

A long reflection on the dynamics that led to worldwide ethnocide, its different “masks”, its history and, according to him, one of its earliest manifestations, monotheism, led Jaulin to a complete reappraisal of the phenomenal and conceptual fields polarized by the notion of ethnocide.

This reassessment took its final shape in the 1995's work, L’univers des totalitarismes : Essai d’ethnologie du “non-être” (in free translation: "The Universe of Totalitarianisms: An Ethnological Essay on “Non-Being”"). In this book, the notion of “totalitarianism” (which should not be mistaken for Hannah Arendt’s concept of totalitarianism) depicts the underlying dynamics of which ethnocide becomes a manifestation among others.

Jaulin defines totalitarianism as an abstract scheme or machine of non-relation to cultural otherness characterized by the expansion of "oneself " ("soi") through an election/exclusion logic. The totalitarian machine operates by splitting the universe into its own “agents” on the one side, and its “objects” on the other, whether they be individuals, families, groups, societies or whole civilizations. It proceeds by depriving the later of their quality of cultural subjects through the erosion and finally the suppression of their space of tradition and cultural invention, which mediates their relation with themselves, i.e. their reflexivity. With the mutilation of their “field of cultural potentialities”, as Jaulin calls it, the totalitarian dynamics transforms its “objects” into new “agents” of expansion, reduced to a mock self-relation defined by the horizon of a potential election. However, to become actual this election needs to articulate with a pole of exclusion; thus the need of a new expansion of this universe of non-relation, the universe of totalitarianisms, by definition an endlessly expanding universe whose theoretical limits paradoxically coincide with its own self-destruction.

The election/exclusion logics works by means of pairs of contradictory and, therefore, mutually exclusive terms. Their content may be as varied as the different semantic domains invested by the totalitarian machine: chosen/doomed, religion/magic, truth/falseness, literate/illiterate, savage/civilized, subject/object, intellectual/manual, proletarians/capitalists, science/illusion, subjectivity/objectivity, etc. In all these contradictory pairs, one of the poles “means” to occupy the whole field; but at the same time, its own meaning and “existence” depends on the virtually excluded pole.

According to Jaulin, the asymmetrical relation portrayed by these pairs is but the starting point of totalitarian movement, its static and temporary position. Its dynamics derives from the “wished for” or prospective inversion of the relation between its two poles. This may happen through the totalitarian pair defining the pre-existing situation, the design of a new one or, more often, through recovery and adaptation of old formulas.

The recovery of the Marxist proletarian/capitalistic contradictory pair or the even older monotheistic chosen/doomed couple by many Independence or Prophetic Movements in the former European colonies as a means of inverting the pre-existing totalitarian field is an instance of the shifts through which the “totalitarian trajectory” reinvents itself. This example also shows the place of ethnocide within the overall totalitarian dynamics as the dialectical alternate to totalitarian inversion.

Such an inexorable and elementary logic, with its ability to migrate to, pervade and finally destroy ever-differing cultural and social worlds, accounts for the endlessly restarted trajectory of totalitarianism's two-pole field through time and space.

== Bibliography ==
- La Mort Sara, Paris, 10/18, 1971 (1967)
- La Paix blanche, Introduction à l'ethnocide, Paris, Éditions du Seuil (Combats), 1970
- Gens de soi, gens de l'autre, Esquisse d'une théorie descriptive, Paris, 10/18, 1974
- Les Chemins du vide, Paris, Éditions Christian Bourgois, 1977
- Jeux et jouets, Paris, Éditions Aubier, 1979
- Notes d'ailleurs, Paris, Éditions Christian Bourgois, 1980
- Mon Thibaud : le jeu de vivre, Paris, Éditions Aubier Montaigne, 1980
- Le Cœur des choses. Ethnologie d'une relation amoureuse, Paris, Éditions Christian Bourgois, 1986
- La Géomancie, Paris, Éditions de la Maison des Sciences de l'homme, 1988
- Géomancie et Islam, Paris, Éditions Christian Bourgois, 1991
- L'Univers des totalitarismes, Essai d'ethnologie du "non être", Paris, Éditions Loris Talmart, 1995

=== In collaboration ===
- De l'ethnocide, 10/18
- Anthropologie et calcul, Paris, 10/18, 1970
- L'Ethnocide à travers les Amériques, Paris, Éditions Fayard, 1972 (translated in Spanish, Editores Siglo XXI, 1976)
- Pourquoi les mathématiques ?, Paris, 10/18, 1974
- La Décivilisation, Bruxelles, Éditions Complexe, 1974

=== Posthumous ===
Exercices d'ethnologie, de Robert Jaulin, Roger Renaud (Éditeur), Paris, Éditions P.U.F., 1999
