= Juan Ginés de Sepúlveda =

Spanish humanist (1490–1573)

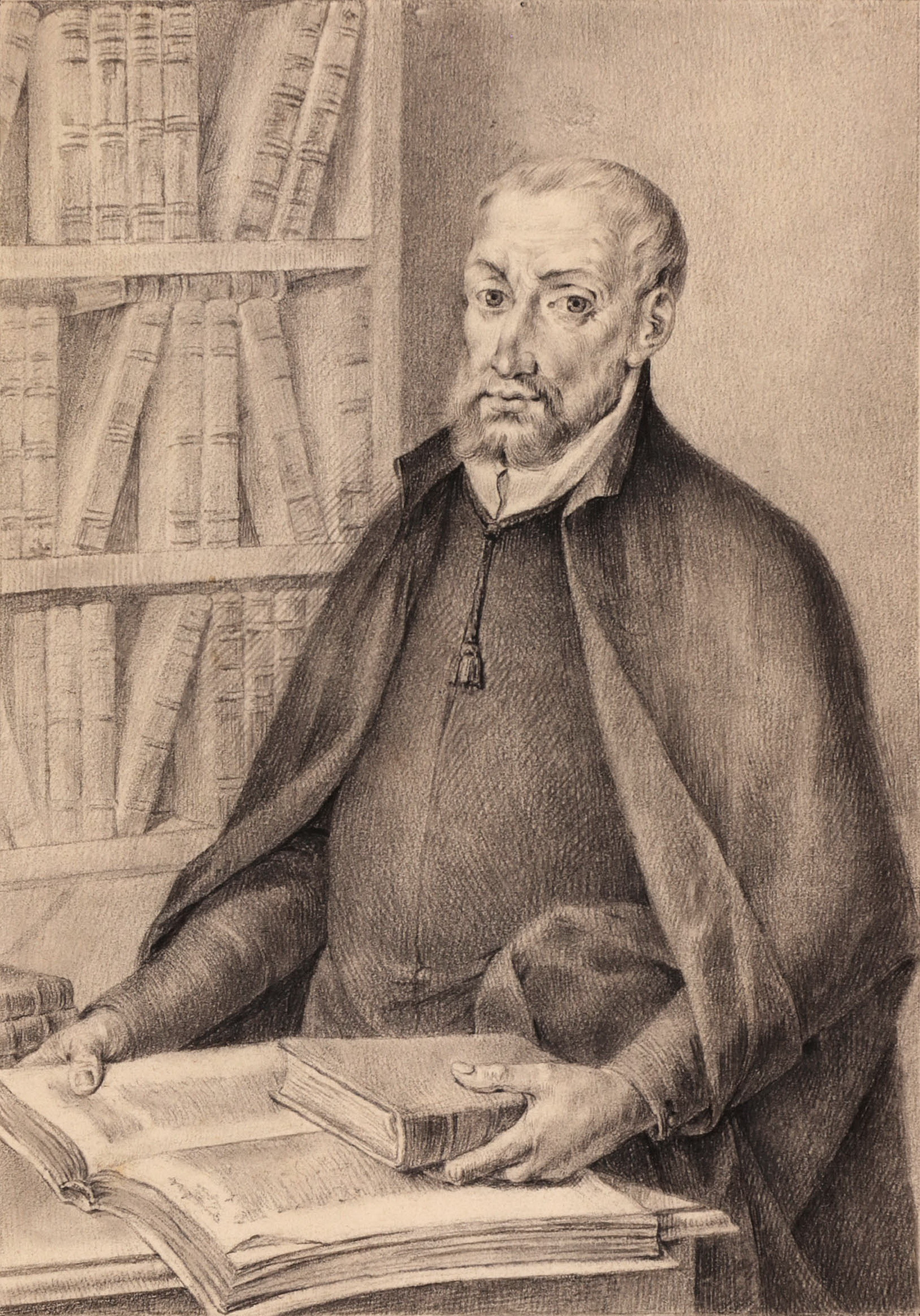
- Born: 1490; Pozoblanco, Córdoba
- Died: 17 November 1573 (age 82 or 83); Pozoblanco, Córdoba
- Occupations: Philosopher, theologian

Juan Ginés de Sepúlveda (1490 – 17 November 1573) was a Spanish humanist, philosopher, and theologian of the Spanish Renaissance. He is mainly known for his participation in a famous debate with Bartolomé de las Casas in Valladolid, Spain, in 1550–1551. The debate centered on the legitimacy of the conquest and colonization of America by the Spanish Empire and on the treatment of the Native Americans. The main philosophical referents of Ginés de Sepúlveda were Aristotle, Saint Thomas Aquinas, Roman law and Christian theology. These influences allowed him to argue for the cultural superiority and domination of the Spanish over the Native Americans during the period of the conquest.

== Biography ==
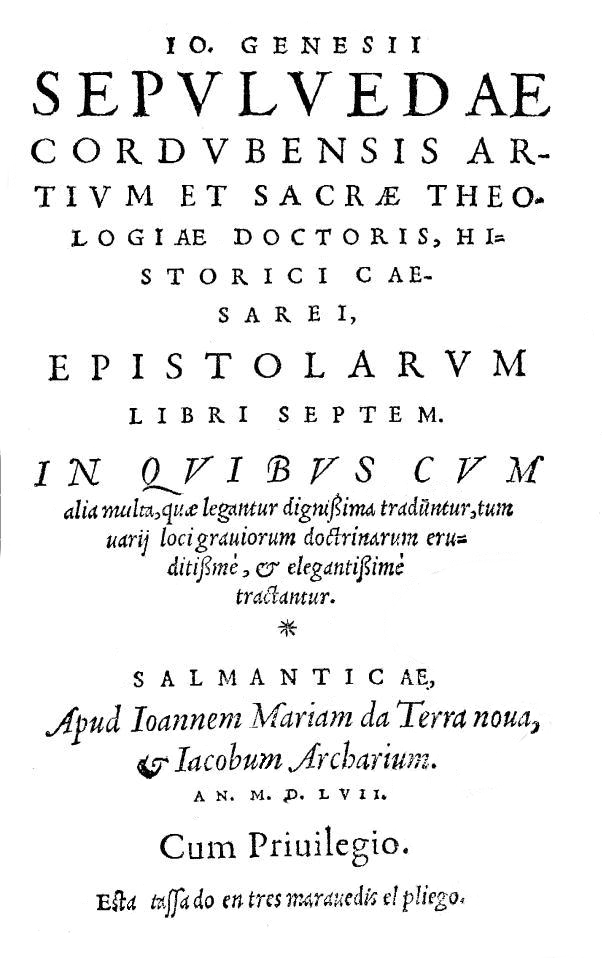
Epistolarum libri septem (1557).

Sepúlveda was born in 1490 at Pozoblanco in the Córdoba province of Spain. He came from a humble background, his parents were Ginés Sánchez Mellado, a craftsman, and María Ruiz. In 1510 he enrolled at the University of Alcalá de Henares, where he studied philosophy and Greek. In 1513 he began studying theology at the College of San Antonio de Sigüenza. Then, in February 1515, he obtained a letter of recommendation from Cardinal Cisneros to attend the prestigious Spanish College in Bologna, Italy, known for its studies in canon law and theology.

In September 1515, Sepúlveda matriculated into the Spanish College where he studied theology and philosophy. Under the tutelage of Pietro Pomponazzi he developed a lifelong appreciation and expertise for the works of Aristotle. While in Bologna, he enjoyed the friendship and patronage of Alberto Pío, Prince of Carpi, and also met Giulio de' Medici who would later become Pope Clement VII. Both men encouraged Sepúlveda to study Aristotle. In the next several years, he translated several of the philosophers works from Greek to Latin, including Parva Naturalia, 1522; De ortu et interitu, 1523; De mundo, 1523; and Meteorum, 1532.

By 1523, Sepúlveda had earned doctorates in arts and theology. He also took religious vows and became a Dominican priest. After Medici became Pope Clement VII in 1523, Sepúlveda served at the papal curia in Rome where he developed a reputation for scholarship and rhetorical skills. He wrote several short works regarding contemporary religious controversies. In 1526 he penned De fato et libero arbitrio against Martin Luther, De ritu nuptiarum in 1531 against Henry VIII's divorce proceedings, and Antapologia against Erasmus in 1532. He despised Luther and strongly disagreed with his theology, but Sepúlveda respected Erasmus and despite their disagreements, they continued to correspond for many years.

He also used his rhetorical skills 1529 to write Ad Carolum V, urging the Habsburg emperor Charles V to unite Europe and fight the Turks. In Democrates (1535) he defended the concept that a just war based on natural law was compatible with Christianity.

He was the adversary of Bartolomé de las Casas in the Valladolid Controversy in 1550 concerning the justification of the Spanish Conquest of the Indies. Sepúlveda was the defender of the Spanish Empire's right of conquest, of colonization, of forced conversion in the New World, and a supporter of colonial slavery. He argued on the base of natural law philosophy and developed a position which was different from the position of the School of Salamanca, as represented famously by Francisco de Vitoria.

=== Spanish colonization of the Americas ===
Sepúlveda was inspired by Aristotelian philosophy, especially his ideas about the natural hierarchy and the superiority of human beings over other species. He used these concepts to argue that Native Americans were "barbaric" and "savage" by nature and therefore justified their subjugation by the Spanish Empire. Sepúlveda also drew on the theology and philosophy of Saint Thomas Aquinas, who argued that there were different degrees of perfection and that some human beings were naturally superior to others. Sepúlveda applied these principles to justify the domination of the Native Americans by the Spanish Empire. Sepúlveda used two concepts from Roman law, especially the idea of just war theory and the right of conquest, to argue that the colonization of the Americas by the Spanish Empire was legally and morally justified. Sepúlveda also appealed to the Bible and Christian theology to justify the forced conversion of Native Americans to Christianity and their subjugation by the Spanish Empire. He interpreted biblical passages and Christian doctrines in support of his position.

The Valladolid Debate was organized by King Charles V to give an answer to the question whether the indigenous peoples of the Americas could be capable of self-governance if they did not follow the ways of Christ, during the Spanish colonization of the Americas.

Sepúlveda defended the position of the colonists, although he had never been to America, claiming that some Amerindians were "natural slaves" as defined by Aristotle in Book I of Politics. "Those whose condition is such that their function is the use of their bodies and nothing better can be expected of them, those, I say, are slaves of nature. It is better for them to be ruled thus." He said these natives are "as children to parents, as women are to men, as cruel people are from mild people". These assertions in regard to some but not all Amerindians were made in Democrates alter de justis belli causis apud Indos (A Second Democrates: on the just causes of war with Indians) Rome, 1550. Although Aristotle was a primary source for Sepúlveda's argument, he also pulled from various Christian and other classical sources, including the Bible.

Las Casas utilized the same sources in his counterargument. According to Bartolomé de las Casas, God had power over all people in the world, including those who had never heard of Christianity. However, he thought that Christianity should be presented to natives as a religious option, not an obligation as Sepulveda believed. Las Casas said that Amerindians ought to enjoy the same freedoms as any other people because, in his view, no Amerindians lacked the ability to rule themselves.

== Works ==
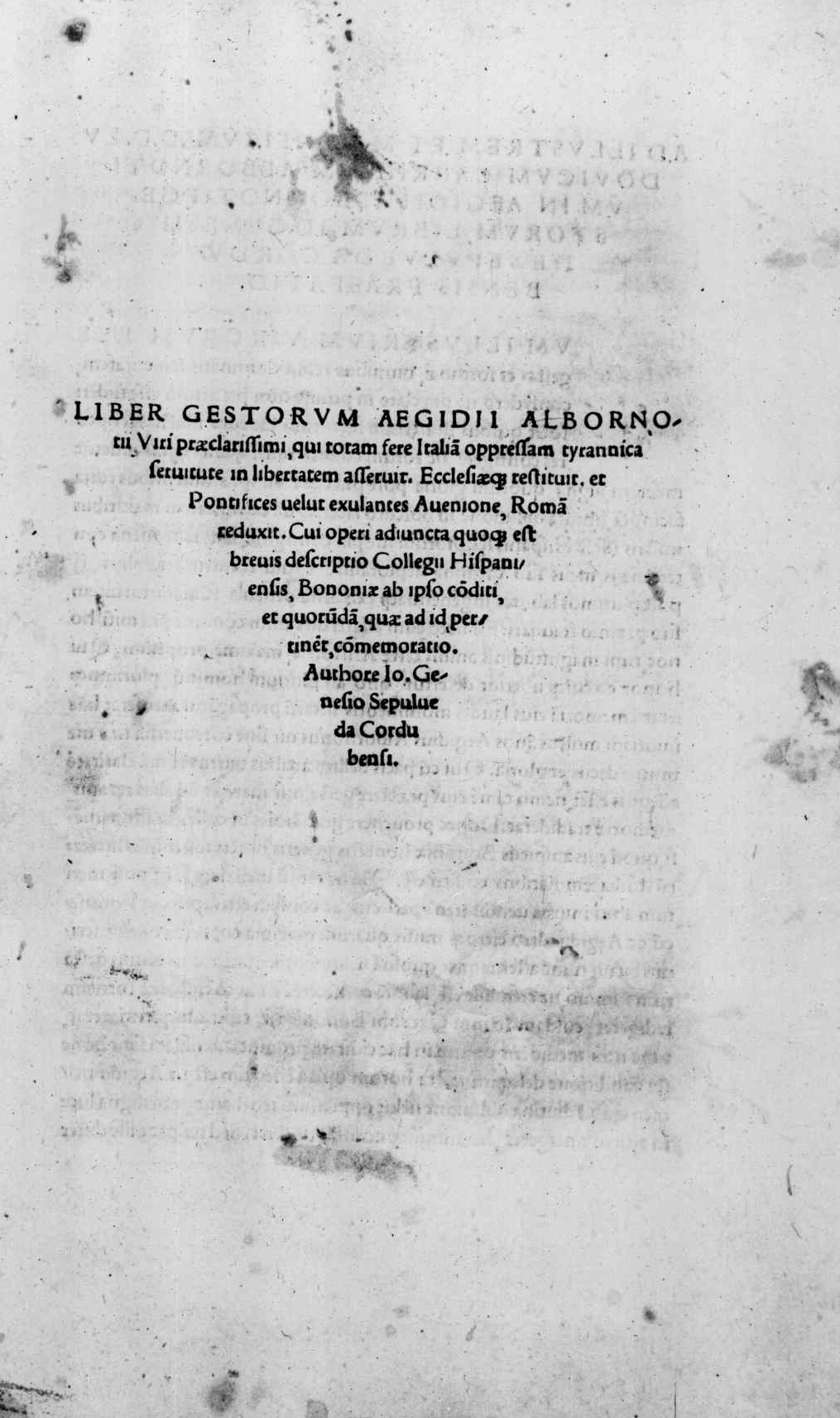
Liber gestorum Aegidii Albornotii, 1521

Selected works by Sepulveda include:

- Liber gestorum Aegidii Albornotii, 1521
- Parva Naturalia, 1522
- Gonsalus sive de appetenda gloria, 1523
- De fato et libero arbitrio, 1526
- Alexandri Aphrodisiei commentaria in Aristotelis Metaphysica, 1527
- Ad Carolum V, 1529
- De ritu nuptiarum et dispensatione, 1531
- Antapologia pro Alberto Pio Carpensi, 1532
- De convenientia militaris disciplinae cum christiana religione qui inscribitur Democrates, Roma, 1535.
- Alexandri Aphrodisiei Commentaria in dvodecim Aristotelis libros De prima philosophia, interprete Ioanne Genesio Sepulveda, 1536.
- Democrates secundus sive de iustis belli causis ..., 1544.
- Apologia pro libro de justis belli causis, 1550.
- De rebus gestis Caroli V, 1556.
- Epistolarum libri septem, 1557.
- De rebus gestis Philippi II, 1564.
- Historia de bello administrato in Italia (in Latin). Bologna: Antonio Giaccarelli & Pellegrino Bonardo. 1559.
- De regno libri III, 1570.
- Opera omnia (in Latin). Köln: Arnold Mylius. 1602.
- Democrates alter, 1892.

== See also ==
- Spanish Renaissance literature
- Valladolid debate

== Bibliography ==
- Bell, Aubrey G. F. (1925). Juan Ginés de Sepúlveda. Hispanic notes & monographs; 9. Oxford University Press.
- Campbell, Gordon (2003). "Sepúlveda, Juan Ginés de". The Oxford dictionary of the Renaissance. Oxford. ISBN 0-19-860175-1.
- Coroleu, Alejandro. "Juan Ginés de Sepúlveda". Real Academia de la Historia (in Spanish).
- Coroleu, Alejandro (1996). "The Fortuna of Juan Ginés de Sepúlveda's Translations of Aristotle and of Alexander of Aphrodisias". Journal of the Warburg and Courtauld Institutes. 59: 325–332. doi:10.2307/751413. ISSN 0075-4390. JSTOR 751413. S2CID 195029925.
- Davis, Scott (1999). "Humanist Ethics and Political Justice: Soto, Sepúlveda, and the "Affair of the Indies"". The Annual of the Society of Christian Ethics. 19: 193–212. doi:10.5840/asce19991911. ISSN 0732-4928. JSTOR 23560082.
- Fernández-Santamaria, José A. (1975). "Juan Ginés de Sepúlveda on the Nature of the American Indians". The Americas. 31 (4): 434–451. doi:10.2307/980012. ISSN 0003-1615. JSTOR 980012. S2CID 147379509.
- Fernández-Santamaria, J. A. (1977). The State, War and Peace : Spanish Political Thought in the Renaissance 1516-1559. Cambridge: Cambridge University Press. pp. 163–236. ISBN 978-0-511-89680-4.
- Hanke, Lewis (1949). The Spanish Struggle for Justice in the Conquest of America. University of Pennsylvania Press. pp. 111–132.
- Hanke, Lewis (1974). All Mankind Is One. DeKalb: Northern Illinois University Press. ISBN 0-87580-043-2.
- Hernandez, Albert (2011). "Juan Ginés de Sepúlveda". Beyond the Pale : reading theology from the margins. Miguel A. De La Torre, Stacey M. Floyd-Thomas. Louisville, Ky.: Westminster John Knox Press. pp. 79–86. ISBN 978-0-664-23679-3.
- Mathers, Constance J. (1996). "Sepúlveda, Juan Ginés De". The Oxford Encyclopedia of the Reformation. Oxford University Press. ISBN 978-0-19-506493-3.
- Nájera, Luna (2016). "Juan Ginés de Sepúlveda". Oxford Bibliographies Online. doi:10.1093/obo/9780195399301-0334.
- Nájera, Luna. ""Myth and Prophecy in Juan Ginés de Sepúlveda’s Crusading "Exhortación", in Bulletin for Spanish and Portuguese Historical Studies, 35:1 (2011).
- Nájera, Luna (2012). "Masculinity, War, and Pursuit of Glory in Sepúlveda's "Gonzalo"". Hispanic Review. 80 (3): 391–412. doi:10.1353/hir.2012.0037. ISSN 0018-2176. JSTOR 23275248. S2CID 142920784.
- Speer, Mary (2020). "Tutoring the King: Juan Ginés de Sepúlveda's Victory over Bartolomé de las Casas". Bulletin of Hispanic Studies. 97 (3): 272–287. doi:10.3828/bhs.2020.15. S2CID 219077275 – via Academia.edu.
