= Sicut dudum =

1435 papal bull forbidding enslavement of Christian natives of the Canary Islands

Sicut dudum Latin for 'Just as Long Ago' Encyclical of Pope Eugene IV
- Signature date: 13 January 1435
- Subject: Forbade enslavement of local natives of the Canary Islands who had converted to Christianity
- Text: In Latin; In English

Sicut dudum (from Latin: "Just as Long Ago") was a papal bull promulgated by Pope Eugene IV in Florence on January 13, 1435, which forbade the enslavement of the Indigenous Guanches people of the Canary Islands who had converted, or were converting to, Christianity and ordered, under pain of excommunication, that all such slaves be set free within 15 days.

The bull is also known as Creator Omnium with the date of 17 December 1434. Sicut dudum is the incipit of the third paragraph of Creator Omnium, echoing the abbreviated version reported by Cardinal Cesare Baronius in his Annales Ecclesiastici.

== Background ==
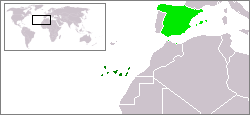
Location of Canary Islands

Christianity had gained many converts in the Canary Islands by the early 1430s. The ownership of the lands had been the subject of dispute between Portugal and the Kingdom of Castille. The lack of effective control had resulted in periodic raids on the islands to procure slaves. Acting on a complaint by Fernando Calvetos, bishop of the islands, Pope Eugene IV issued a papal bull, Creator omnium, on 17 December 1434, annulling previous permission granted to Portugal to conquer those islands still pagan. Eugene excommunicated anyone who enslaved newly converted Christians, the penalty to stand until the captives were restored to their liberty and possessions.

== Sicut dudum ==
Eugene issued Sicut dudum that affirmed the ban on enslavement, and ordered, under pain of excommunication, that all such slaves be immediately set free:

We order and command all and each of the faithful of each sex, within the space of fifteen days of the publication of these letters in the place where they live, that they restore to their earlier liberty all and each person of either sex who were once residents of said Canary Islands, and made captives since the time of their capture, and who have been made subject to slavery. These people are to be totally and perpetually free, and are to be let go without the exaction or reception of money.

Eugene went on to say that, "If this is not done when the fifteen days have passed, they incur the sentence of excommunication by the act itself, from which they cannot be absolved, except at the point of death, even by the Holy See, or by any Spanish bishop, or by the aforementioned Ferdinand, unless they have first given freedom to these captive persons and restored their goods." The specific reference to Spanish bishops and Bishop Ferdinand of San Marcial del Rubicón in Lanzarote suggests that the Portuguese were not the only ones engaged in slave raids in the Canaries.

Sicut dudum is viewed as a significant condemnation of slavery, issued sixty years before the Europeans found the New World.

Portuguese soldiers continued to raid the islands during 1435 and Eugene issued a general edict that prohibited wars being waged in the Canaries and prohibiting the capture of slaves. Due to the complaints made by King Duarte of Portugal, the Pope tempered this edict with the bull Romanus Pontifex on 15 September 1436, that allowed the Portuguese to conquer any unconverted parts of the Canary Islands. The king suggested that Portugal be authorized to evangelize and civilize the islands, as other less reputable persons were unlikely to heed the pontiff. Political weakness compelled the Renaissance Papacy to adopt an acquiescent and unchallenging position when approached for requests for privileges in favour of these ventures. Without a navy of his own to police the islands, the Pope opted in favor of the Portuguese as the lesser of two evils.

In 1476 Pope Sixtus IV reiterated the concerns expressed in Sicut dudum in his papal bull, Regimini gregis, in which he threatened to excommunicate all captains or pirates who enslaved Christians.
