= Creator Omnium =

1434 papal bull by pope Eugene IV

Creator Omnium was a papal bull issued by Pope Eugene IV on 17 December 1434 that condemned the enslavement of the inhabitants of the Canary Islands and ordered, under pain of excommunication, that all such slaves be set free within 15 days of its publication.

The bull is also known as Sicut Dudum with the date of 13 January 1435, a title that is the incipit of the third paragraph of Creator Omnium, echoing the abbreviated version reported by Cardinal Cesare Baronius in his Annales Ecclesiastici.

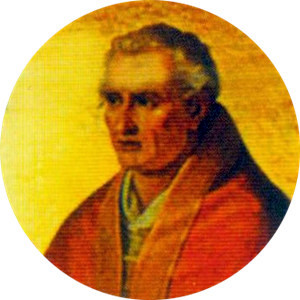
Eugene IV

== Background ==
Christianity had gained many converts in the Canary Islands by the early 1430s; however the ownership of the lands had been the subject of dispute between Portugal and the Kingdom of Castile. The lack of effective control had resulted in periodic raids on the islands to procure slaves. As early as the Council of Koblenz in 922, the capture of Christians as slaves by other Christians had been condemned.

In 1424, Prince Henry of Portugal sent a fleet to invade Gran Canaria. The expedition failed. By 1432, he tried to persuade his father, John I of Portugal, to finance another attempt. However, when his brother, Duarte, inherited the throne in 1433, the new king agreed. A landing on Gran Canaria was made in 1434, but repulsed by the native Guanches, and the expedition then plundered the Castilian missions on Lanzarote and Fuerteventura.

A complaint was lodged by Fernando Calvetos, the Castilian bishop of San Marcial del Rubicón in Lanzarote, supported by the archbishop of Seville. Calvetos informed the pope of the pillaging carried out by the Portuguese "pirates". Pope Eugene IV issued Regimini gregis on 29 September 1434, and Creator Omnium, on 17 December 1434, forbidding any further raids on the Canaries and ordered the immediate manumission of all Christian converts enslaved during the attack.

== Content ==
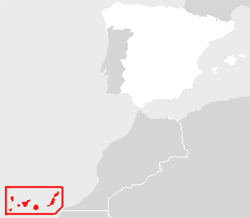
Locator map of Canary

The text of the Bull reads, in part:

We order and command all and each of the faithful of each sex, within the space of fifteen days of the publication of these letters in the place where they live, that they restore to their earlier liberty all and each person of either sex who were once residents of said Canary Islands, and made captives since the time of their capture, and who have been made subject to slavery. These people are to be totally and perpetually free, and are to be let go without the exaction or reception of money.

Creator Omnium alludes to the common humanity between all people. Eugene excommunicated anyone who enslaved natives of the Canaries, the penalty to stand until the captive was restored to their liberty and possessions.

J. Gordon Melton interprets the Bull to be possibly be limited to converts.

Michael Stogre holds that Eugenius intended the ban to protect non-Christians as well, in keeping with the view of Innocent IV that the flock of Christ included "pagan sheep" that he ultimately hoped to Christianize.

== Sources ==
- Housley, Norman. Religious Warfare in Europe 1400-1536, Oxford University Press, 2002 ISBN 9780198208112
- "Christopher Columbus and the enslavement of the Amerindians in the Caribbean. (Columbus and the New World Order 1492-1992).", Sued-Badillo, Jalil, Monthly Review. Monthly Review Foundation, Inc. 1992. HighBeam Research. 10 August 2009
- Monumenta Henricina, (1960–1967), Manuel Lopes de Almeida, Idalino Ferreira da Costa Brochado and Antonio Joaquim
- Creator Omnium: Full text, in Latin, with Portuguese commentary, in: Monumenta Henricina Volume I (Coimbra: UC Biblioteca Geral 1, 1963), pp. 118-123, no. 52.
