= Sublimis Deus =

1537 papal bull banning slavery

Sublimis Deus Latin for 'The sublime God' Papal bull of Pope Paul III
- Signature date: 2 June 1537
- Subject: Prohibition of the enslavement of the Indigenous people of the Americas
- Text: In English

Sublimis Deus (English: The sublime God; erroneously cited as Sublimus Dei) is a Papal bull promulgated by Pope Paul III on 2 June 1537, which forbids the enslavement of the Indigenous peoples of the Americas (called "Indians of the West and the South") and all other Indigenous people who could be discovered later or previously known. It states that the Indians are fully rational human beings who have rights to freedom and property, even if they are heathen.

In Sublimis Deus, Paul III declares the Indigenous peoples of the Americas to be "truly men and that they are not only capable of understanding the Catholic Faith but, according to our information, they desire exceedingly to receive it", and denounces any idea to the contrary as directly inspired by the "enemy of the human race". He goes on to condemn their reduction to slavery in the strongest terms, declaring it null and void for any people known as well as any that could be discovered in the future, entitles their right to liberty and property, and concludes with a call for their evangelization.

The bull had a strong impact on the Valladolid debate. Its principles became part of New Laws issued by Charles V in Spain, although such laws were often ignored by the colonists and conquistadores themselves.

The ecclesiastical letter Pastorale officium, issued a few days before the encyclical, imposed excommunication on conquerors who enslave the Indigenous people. This punishment was subsequently repealed after petition by the Emperor.

== Background ==
With the realization that the Americas represented regions of the Earth of which the Europeans were not aware earlier, there arose intense speculation over the question whether the natives of these lands were natural slaves (and perhaps lesser humans) or not. Together with that went a debate over the (mis)treatment of these natives by the Conquistadores and colonists. The main impetus for Sublimis Deus was a council held by prominent Missionaries in Mexico in 1537, including Archbishop Juan de Zumárraga, Bartolomé de Las Casas and Bishop of Puebla Julián Garcés. They discussed the methods of converting the natives, especially the Franciscan practice of mass baptism. Basing a recommendation to the pope on Las Casas' treatise on how to convert the Indians, "De Unico Vocationis Modo", they sent a letter to Rome with Dominican friar named Bernardino de Minaya. In 1537, Minaya arrived in Rome and pleaded his case on behalf of the Indians.

In response, Pope Paul III released Sublimis Deus on 2 June 1537. A few days before, he issued Pastorale officium, a brief that declared automatic excommunication for anyone who failed to abide by the new ruling, on 29 May 1537; Pastorale officium was later annulled.

== Impact ==
Gustavo Gutierrez describes Sublimis Deus as the most important papal document relating to the condition of native Indians and observes that it was addressed to all Christians. John Francis Maxwell notes that the bull did not change the traditional teaching that the enslavement of Indians was permissible if they were considered "enemies of Christendom" as this would be considered by the Church as a "just war". Stogre further argues that the Indian nations had every right to self-defense. Rodney Stark describes the bull as "magnificent" and believes the reason that, in his opinion, it has belatedly come to light is due to the neglect of Protestant historians. Toyin Falola asserts that the bull related to the native populations of the New World and did not condemn the transatlantic African slave trade stimulated by the Spanish monarchy and the Holy Roman Emperor.

There is still some controversy about how this bull is related to the documents known as Veritas ipsa, Unigenitus Deus and Pastorale officium (29 May 1537). Alberto de la Hera believes that Veritas ipsa and Unigenitus Deus are simply other versions of Sublimis Deus, and not separate bulls. Joel Panzer sees Veritas ipsa as an earlier draft of Sublimis Deus.

Michael Stogre notes that Sublimis Deus is not present in the Enchiridion, the authoritative but incomplete compendium of official teachings of the Catholic Church (1854) (however, it is on the current Vatican website), and that the executing brief for it (Pastorale officium) was annulled the following year, though this is not conclusive proof that Sublimis Deus itself was ever officially annulled. David Brion Davis asserts it was annulled due to a dispute with the Spanish crown. The Council of The West Indies and the Crown concluded that the documents broke their patronato rights and the Pope withdrew them, though they continued to circulate and be quoted by La Casas and others who supported Indian rights.

According to James E. Falkowski, Sublimis Deus had the effect of revoking Pope Alexander VI's bull Inter caetera but still leaving the colonizers the duty of converting the native people. Hans-Jürgen Prein observes the difficulty in reconciling these decrees with Inter caetera.

== See also ==
- Protector of the Indians
- Catholic Church and the Age of Discovery
- Laws of Burgos
