= In plurimis =

1888 papal encyclical by Pope Leo XIII

In plurimis Latin for 'Among the Many' Encyclical of Pope Leo XIII
- Signature date: 5 May 1888
- Subject: On the abolition of slavery
- Number: 25 of 88 of the pontificate
- Text: In English

In plurimis (Among the Many) is a papal encyclical issued by Pope Leo XIII on May 5, 1888, on the abolition of slavery in Brazil. Using the royal we, Leo XIII addresses the bishops of the Empire of Brazil on behalf of the enslaved people of the country, expressing joy at the growing abolitionism in Brazil. He then turns to theological discussion, explaining how slavery is not natural but due to original sin, how Jesus came to free slaves and mankind from slavery; how the Twelve Apostles taught that all men are equal before God; how the Church Fathers and the Catholic Church have always been opposed to slavery; how non-Christian masters are wicked, while Christian masters are kind, toward slaves; how Christians do not enslave other Christians since they are brethren; how the Popes have always fought for slaves' rights; how Christian nations were the first to abolish slavery; and how Christian missionaries seek to introduce abolitionism to the peoples they evangelize. Leo XIII finishes the encyclical by exhorting the bishops of Brazil toward abolitionism, rejoicing over the freeing of many slaves in their land, and addressing the Brazilian slaves, offering advice on using freedom for the doing of good deeds.

== See also ==
- Abolitionism in Brazil
- Catholic Church and slavery
- In supremo apostolatus
- Magnificas humanitas
