= Catholic Church and slavery =

The Catholic Church and slavery have a long and complicated history. Slavery was practiced and accepted by many cultures and religions around the world throughout history, including in ancient Rome. Passages in the Old Testament sanctioned forms of temporal slavery for Israelites as a means to repay a debt. Slaves, captured in war or purchased, and their children were enslaved for life. After Christianity was legalized under the Roman empire, sentiment grew that many kinds of slavery were incompatible with Christian justice. Views ranged from rejecting all forms of slavery to accepting slavery subject to certain restrictions (Thomas Aquinas). The Christian West almost entirely enforced that a free Christian could not be enslaved, for example as a captive in war. However, this was not consistently applied throughout history. The Middle Ages witnessed the emergence of orders of monks such as the Mercedarians who focused on ransoming Christian slaves. By the end of the medieval period, enslavement of Christians had been largely abolished throughout Europe, although enslavement of non-Christians remained permissible and was revived in Spain and Portugal. Slavery remained a subject of debate within the Church for centuries, with several Popes issuing bulls on the issue, such as Sublimis Deus.

By the 1800s, the Church reached relative consensus in favor of condemning chattel slavery and praising its abolition.

== History ==
After 313, when Constantine legalized Christianity within the Roman Empire, Church teachings concerning charity and justice began influencing Roman laws and policies. Pope Callixtus I (bishop of Rome 218–222) was a slave in his youth. Slavery decreased with multiple abolition movements in the late 5th century.

Catholic clergy, religious orders, and popes owned slaves, and the naval galleys of the Papal States used captured Muslim galley slaves in particular. Some Catholic saints appeared to have owned slaves, including Philemon of Colossae, Gregory of Tours and Marie-Marguerite d'Youville. Catholic teaching began, however, to turn against slavery from 1435.

While the Age of Discovery greatly increased the number of slaves owned by Christians, the response of the clergy, under strong political pressures, was ineffective in preventing the establishment of slave-owning societies in the colonies of Catholic countries. Earlier Papal bulls, such as Pope Nicholas V's Dum Diversas (1452) and Romanus Pontifex (1454) were used to justify enslavement during this era.

An early shipment of Black Africans during the transatlantic slave trade was initiated at the request of Bishop Las Casas and authorized by Charles V, Holy Roman Emperor in 1517. However, Las Casas later rejected all forms of "unjust" slavery and became known as the protector of Indian rights.

Multiple popes issued papal bulls condemning mistreatment of Native Americans and "unjust" enslavement ("just" enslavement was an accepted form of punishment); however, these were largely ignored. Nonetheless, Catholic missionaries such as the Jesuits worked to alleviate the suffering of Native American slaves. Debate about the morality of slavery continued throughout this period. Some books critical of slavery were placed on the Index of Forbidden Books by the Holy Office between 1573 and 1826. Capuchin missionaries were excommunicated for calling for the emancipation of black slaves in the Americas, although they were reinstated when the Holy Office under Pope Innocent XI sided with them rather than the bishop who had excommunicated them.

Throughout the 1700s and 1800s, the Church did missionary work in the Americas, targeting both slave and non-slave. On 22 December 1741, Pope Benedict XIV promulgated the papal bull Immensa Pastorum Principis against the enslavement of the indigenous peoples of the Americas and other countries. Pope Gregory XVI in his 1839 bull In supremo apostolatus also condemned slavery as contrary to human dignity. In 1866, the Holy Office of Pope Pius IX stated that, subject to conditions, it was not against divine law for a slave to be sold, bought, or exchanged. Pope Leo XIII in 1888 wrote to the bishops of Brazil setting forth the position of the Church on slavery: he condemned the cruelties of the slave-trade and commended the abolition of slavery in the region.

In 1995, Pope John Paul II repeated the condemnation of "infamies", including slavery, issued by the Second Vatican Council:

Thirty years later, taking up the words of the Council and with the same forcefulness I repeat that condemnation in the name of the whole Church, certain that I am interpreting the genuine sentiment of every upright conscience.

In 2026, Pope Leo XIV, through his encyclical Magnifica Humanitas, "sincerely ask for pardon" for the Church's delay in denouncing "the scourge of slavery" throughout history:

Although there was not always consistency in practice — given that slavery was long tolerated before being unequivocally condemned — there has been a continuous affirmation throughout history of the dignity of every human being, created in the image of God, even if it took eighteen centuries for its full incompatibility with slavery to be explicitly recognized. This constitutes a wound in Christian memory, one from which we cannot consider ourselves detached. It is impossible not to feel deep sorrow when contemplating the immense suffering and humiliation endured by so many in stark contrast to their immeasurable dignity as persons infinitely loved by the Lord. For this, in the name of the Church, I sincerely ask for pardon.

== Catholic teaching ==
An explanation of the Baltimore Catechism of Christian Doctrine used to teach the Catholic Faith in North America from 1885 to 1960 details the following explanation of the second sorrowful mystery of the rosary:

(2) The scourging of Our Lord at the pillar. This also has been explained. What terrible cruelty existed in the world before Christianity ! In our times the brute beasts have more protection from cruel treatment than the pagan slaves had then. The Church came to their assistance. It taught that all men are God's children, that slaves as well as masters were redeemed by Jesus Christ, and that masters must be kind and just to their slaves. Many converts from paganism through love for Our Lord and this teaching of the Church, granted liberty to their slaves; and thus as civilization spread with the teaching of Christianity, slavery ceased to exist. It was not in the power of the Church, however, to abolish slavery everywhere, but she did it as soon as she could. Even at present she is fighting hard to protect the poor negroes of Africa against it, or at least to moderate its cruelty.

The Catechism of the Catholic Church published in 1994 set out the official position:

The Seventh Commandment forbids acts or enterprises that .... lead to the enslavement of human beings, to their being bought, sold and exchanged like merchandise, in disregard for their personal dignity. It is a sin against the dignity of persons and their fundamental rights to reduce them by violence to their productive value or to a source of profit. St. Paul directed a Christian master to treat his Christian slave "no longer as a slave but more than a slave, as a beloved brother .... both in the flesh and in the Lord."

=== Development ===
Beginning in the Middle Ages, the Christian understanding of slavery reflected significant internal conflict and endured dramatic change. Ultimately, the concept of slavery as private property was condemned by the Church, which classified it as the theft of human rights, a concept of classical liberalism that dominated most of the Western world beginning in the 19th century.

=== Definitions ===
The Church at times distinguished between various forms and elements of "slavery". These considered the making of slaves, or "new enslavement", trafficking and trading, and ownership. A distinction was made between "just" and "unjust" slavery, and whether a particular slave was "justly" or "unjustly" kept in that condition might depend on religious status. The church long accepted the right to sell oneself or one's children into slavery, at times fairly common, or to be sentenced to slavery as a criminal punishment. Slavery was long regarded as a matter of secular law.

The Church contrasted this with "just servitude", making a metaphysical distinction between owning a person as an object, and owning that person's work product. A person could be bought sold or exchanged as a form of "just servitude" subject to certain conditions. Debt slavery was typically a different matter legally under both pre-Christian and Christian legal systems; it might be for a specific period, and the owner typically did not have the right to sell the slave without his/her agreement, along with other restrictions. This might be better termed indentured labour. Ancient legal systems included those in the Old Testament, which also typically distinguished between native and foreign slaves, with better protection for the former. This distinction was applied to Christian versus non-Christian slaves, sometimes with an origin component, for example in Anglo-Saxon laws. It remained important in Christian thinking and legal systems, in particular for new enslavements. The Christian church treated slaves as persons, and they were allowed to be baptised, marry, and to be ordained as pastors. This tended to be reflected in slavery laws of Catholic countries, French slaves, for example, were allowed to marry other slaves or free people, though neither baptism nor marriage emancipated them—an issue in the French legal case of Jean Boucaux (1737).

Catholic layman Cochin, reviewing the moral arguments that underpinned Church teaching and definitions relating to "just" slavery wrote in 1861:

They teach concerning slavery what was taught yesterday and the day before, but what no priest or layman believes any longer today. They teach that slavery is not unlawful, firstly, when it proceeds from a legitimate war or voluntary sale; secondly, provided it respects the soul, body, family, and instruction of the slave. But I challenge anyone to show me today, throughout all Christianity, a single slave who has become such as a prisoner of war or through voluntary sale, to say nothing of the manner in which he is treated.

In 1530 the first judges in Audiencia, New Spain, contrasted servitude as practised in Christian Europe with that of the Indians in a letter to Charles V: 'they [Indians] treat slaves as relations, while the Christians treat them as dogs'.

=== Slavery in the New Testament ===
In several Pauline epistles, and the First Epistle of Peter, slaves (the Greek word used, δοῦλοι, is ambiguous, also used to mean servant), are admonished to obey their masters, as to the Lord, and not to men; however Masters were told to serve their slaves "in the same way" and "even better" as "brothers", to not threaten them as God is their Master as well. Slaves who are treated wrongly and unjustly are likened to the wrongs that Christ unjustly suffered, and Masters are told that God "shows no favoritism" and that "anyone who does wrong will be repaid for his wrong."

The Epistle to Philemon is an important text in regard to slavery; it was used by pro-slavery advocates as well as by abolitionists. In the epistle, Paul writes that he is returning Onesimus, a fugitive slave, to his master Philemon; Paul also entreats Philemon to regard Onesimus as a beloved brother in Christ, rather than as a slave. Cardinal Dulles points out that, "while discreetly suggesting that he manumit Onesimus, [Paul] does not say that Philemon is morally obliged to free Onesimus and any other slaves he may have had." However, in his homilies on Philemon, Chrysostom opposes unfair and unjust forms of slavery by stating that those who own slaves are to passionately love their slaves with the very Love of Christ for humanity: "this ... is the glory of a Master, to have grateful slaves. And this is the glory of a Master, that He should thus love His slaves ... Let us therefore be stricken with awe at this so great love of Christ. Let us be inflamed with this love-potion. Though a man be low and mean, yet if we hear that he loves us, we are above all things warmed with love towards him, and honor him exceedingly. And do we then love? And when our Master loves us so much, we are not excited?"

In the First Epistle to Timothy, slave traders are condemned, and listed among the sinful and lawbreakers. The First Epistle to the Corinthians describes lawful manumission as ideal for slaves.

=== Early Christianity ===
Early Christianity encouraged kindness towards slaves. The rape of slaves, considered entirely normal in most preceding systems, was prohibited under the strict ban on sex outside marriage. Christianity recognised marriage of sorts among slaves, freeing slaves was regarded as an act of charity. Roman law instead regarded slaves as property rather than persons. Slaves could marry and be ordained as priests. This difference in legal status in the long term undermined slavery's legitimacy.

Nevertheless, early Christianity rarely criticised the institution of slavery. The Pentateuch gave protection to fugitive slaves, but the Church often condemned with anathema slaves who fled their masters and refused them Eucharistic communion.

In 340 the Synod of Gangra in Asia Minor condemned certain Manicheans for twenty practices including forbidding marriage, not eating meat, urging that slaves should liberate themselves, abandoning their families, asceticism and reviling married priests. The later Council of Chalcedon declared that the canons of the Synod were ecumenical (in other words, were viewed as conclusively representative of the wider church).

Augustine of Hippo, who renounced Manicheanism, opposed unfair and unjust forms of slavery by observing that they originate in human sinfulness, rather than the Creator's original just design of the world that had included the basic equality of all human beings as good creatures made in God's image and likeness.

John Chrysostom described slavery as 'the fruit of covetousness, of degradation, of savagery ... the fruit of sin, [and] of [human] rebellion against ... our true Father' in his Homilies on Ephesians. Moreover, quoting partly from Paul the Apostle, Chrysostom opposed unjust slavery by giving these instructions to those who owned slaves: "'And ye masters', he continues, 'do the same things unto them'. The same things. What are these? 'With good-will do service' ... and 'with fear and trembling' ... toward God, fearing lest He one day accuse you for your negligence toward your slaves ... 'And forbear threatening;' be not irritating, he means, nor oppressive ... [and masters are to obey] the law of the common Lord and Master of all ... doing good to all alike ... dispensing the same rights to all". Chrysostom preaching on Acts 4:32–4:33 in a sermon entitled, "Should we not make it a heaven on earth?", stated, "I will not speak of slaves, since at that time there was no such thing, but doubtless such as were slaves they set at liberty..."

Onetime slave Saint Patrick (415–493) argued for abolition, as had Gregory of Nyssa (c.335–394), and Acacius of Amida (400–425). Origen (c.185–254) favoured the Jewish practice of freeing slaves after seven years. Saint Eligius (588–650) used his wealth to manumit British and Saxon slaves in groups of 50 and 100.

=== Pope Gregory I ===
Pope Gregory I in his Pastoral Care (c. 600), a popular text for centuries, wrote "Slaves should be told ...[not] to despise their masters and recognise they are only slaves". In his Commentary on the Book of Job he wrote that "All men are equal by nature but .... a hidden dispensation by providence has arranged a hierarchy of merit and rulership, in that differences between classes of men have arisen as a result of sin and are ordained by divine justice". He directed slaves to be employed by the monasteries as well as forbidding the unrestricted allowance of slaves joining the monastery to escape their servitude. Upon manumitting two slaves held by the Church, he wrote:

Since our Redeemer, the Maker of every creature, was pleased mercifully to assume human flesh in order to break the chain of slavery in which we were held captive, and restore us to our pristine liberty, it is right that men, whom nature from the beginning produced free, and whom the law of nations has subjected to the yoke of slavery, should be restored by the benefit of manumission to the liberty in which they were born.

— Pope Gregory the Great

However, papal estates continued to possess several hundred slaves despite Gregory's rhetoric on the natural liberty of mankind.

=== Aquinas and Bonaventure ===
Thomas Aquinas taught that, although the subjection of one person to another (servitus) could not be derived from natural law, it could be appropriate based on an individual's actions and socially useful in a world impaired by original sin. Aquinas did not believe that slavery was justified by natural law, since all men are equal by nature. For Aquinas, slavery only arises through positive law.

St Thomas Aquinas in mid-thirteenth century accepted the new Aristotelian view of slavery as well as the titles of slave ownership derived from Roman civil law and attempted—without complete success—to reconcile them with Christian patristic tradition. He takes the patristic theme... that slavery exists as a consequence of original sin and says that it exists according to the "second intention" of nature; it would not have existed in the state of original innocence according to the "first intention" of nature; in this way he can explain the Aristotelian teaching that some people are slaves "by nature" like inanimate instruments, because of their personal sins; for since the slave cannot work for his own benefit slavery is necessarily a punishment. He accepts the symbiotic master-slave relationship as being mutually beneficial. There should be no punishment without some crime, so slavery as a penalty is a matter of positive law. St Thomas' explanation continued to be expounded at least until the end of the 18th century.

Jarrett and Herbert side with historian Paul Weithman, contending that Aquinas held that slavery could not be arrived at via natural law. It could, thus, only be arrived at as a consequence of man's action. Thus, slavery could not be the natural state, but could be imposed as a legal or political consequence. Aquinas's contemporary Saint Bonaventure argued on ethical grounds that slavery was "infamous" and "perverting virtue", but accepted its legality.

== Early Christianity ==
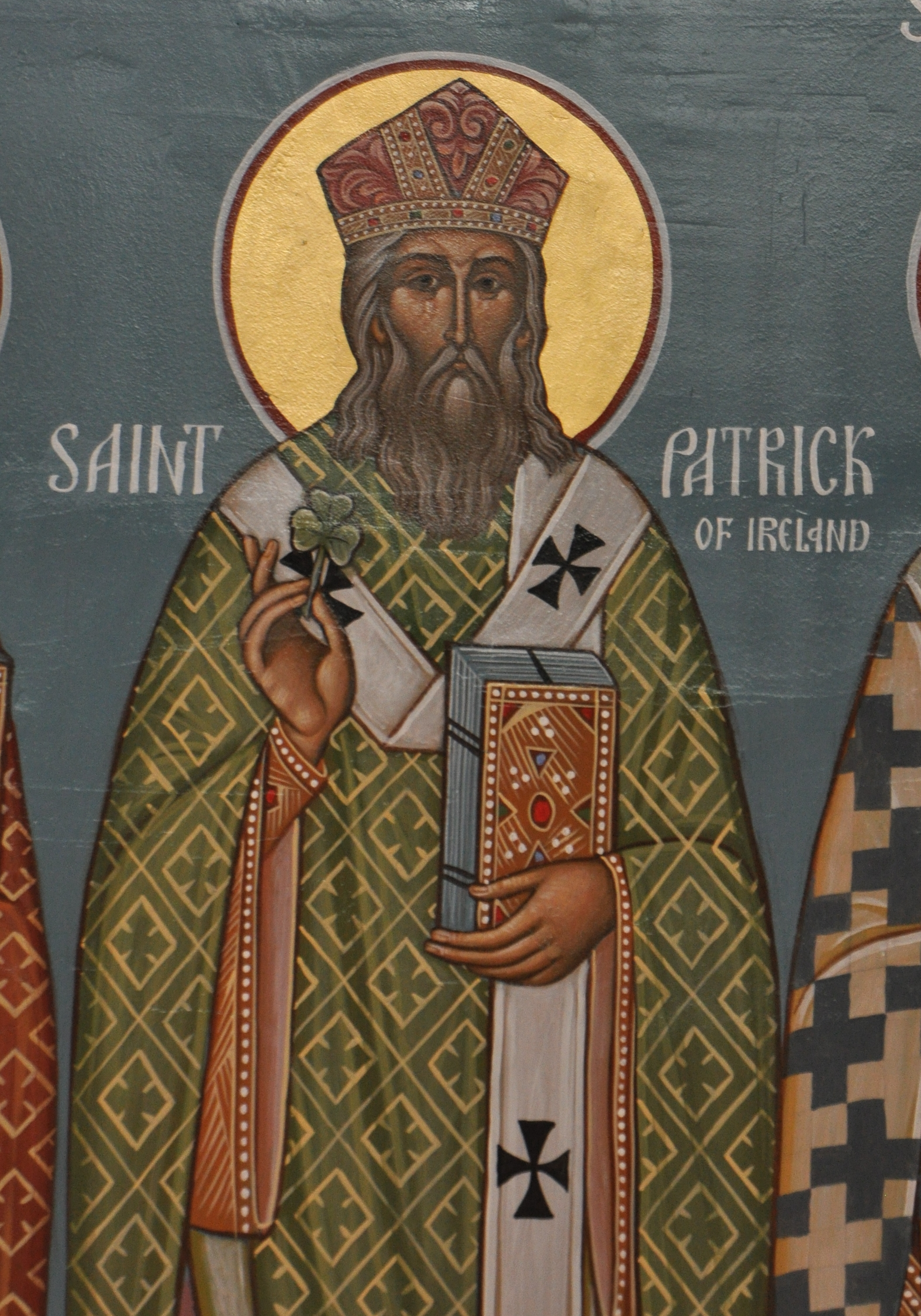
Modern Icon of Saint Patrick, who had been enslaved by pirates

Two early Popes, Callixtus I and Pius I, had been slaves, as had Saint Patrick, the patron saint of Ireland, who had been taken there by pirates and enslaved. He escaped and returned on orders of the pope Celestine I to evangelize the pagans there.

The Catholic Encyclopedia claimed that, in order for the Church to have condemned slavery, it would have had to be willing to incite a revolution that could have destroyed "all civilization".

"Primitive Christianity did not attack slavery directly, but it acted as though slavery did not exist..... To reproach the Church of the first ages with not having condemned slavery in principle, and with having tolerated it in fact, is to blame it for not having let loose a frightful revolution, in which, perhaps, all civilization would have perished with Roman society."

Brumley claimed, regarding early Christianity and slavery:

- While Paul told slaves to obey their masters, he made no general defense of slavery, anymore than he made a general defense of pagan Rome, in which Christians were instructed to obey despite its injustices (cf. Romans 13:1–7). He seems simply to have regarded slavery as an intractable part of the social order, an order that he may well have thought would pass away (1 Corinthians 7:29–31).
- Paul told masters to treat their slaves justly and kindly (Ephesians 6:9, Colossians 4:1), implying that slaves are not mere property for masters to do with as they please.
- Paul implied that the brotherhood shared by Christians is ultimately incompatible with chattel slavery. In the case of Onesimus, Paul wrote to Philemon, the slave's master, instructing him to receive Onesimus back "no longer as a slave but more than a slave, a brother" (Philem. 6). With respect to salvation in Christ, Paul insisted that "there is neither slave nor free ... you are all one in Christ Jesus" (Galatians 3:27–28).
- Christian principles of charity ("love your neighbor as yourself") and the Golden Rule ("Do unto others as you would have them to do unto you") espoused by New Testament writers are ultimately incompatible with chattel slavery, even if, because of its deeply established role as a social institution, this point was not clearly understood at the time.
- While the Christian Empire did not immediately outlaw slavery, some Church fathers (such as Gregory of Nyssa and John Chrysostom) strongly denounced it. But then, the state often failed to enact a just social order in accord with Church teachings.
- Some early Christians liberated their slaves, while some churches redeemed slaves using the congregation's common means. Some Christians sold themselves into slavery to emancipate others.
- Even where slavery was not fully repudiated, slaves and free men had equal access to the sacraments. Many clerics were from slave backgrounds, including popes. This implied a fundamental equality incompatible with slavery.
- The Church ameliorated the harsher aspects of slavery in the Empire, even trying to protect slaves by law, until slavery all but disappeared in the West. It re-emerged during the Renaissance, as Europeans encountered Muslim slave traders and indigenous Americans.

In 340, the Synod of Gangra in Asia Minor, condemned certain Manicheans for a list of twenty practices including forbidding marriage, abandoning their families, slaves despising masters and running away under the pretext of piety, false asceticism and reviling married priests.

== Middle Ages ==
The main thrust of the church's policy on slavery in early medieval Europe was to abolish the enslavement of previously free Christians. Slaves who converted or were baptized as infants in slavery were not included. It was common practice in the ancient world and Christianized migration period societies for war captives, often including the entire population of captured cities, to be enslaved as spoils of war. This remained acceptable to the Church only for non-Christian captives. Getting this principle accepted in Christian societies took centuries. According to the Cambridge Economic History of Europe "one of the finest achievements of Christian ethics was the enforcement of respect for this maxim [that free Christians could not be enslaved], slowly to be sure, for it is still being recalled in England early in the eleventh century, but in the long run most effectively."

Slave trafficking was often condemned, and was regarded by Christians as ethically dubious, rife with abuse (as it had been before Christianity). The sale of Christians to non-Christians, which was often forbidden (except for Eastern Orthodox). Export of Christian slaves to non-Christian lands was often prohibited, for example at the Council of Koblenz (922) and the Council of London (1102). Slave ownership was not condemned in the same way, except that Jews, typically the only non-Christian group accepted in these societies, were forbidden to own Christian slaves.

By the end of the medieval period, enslavement of Christians had been largely abolished throughout Europe. Serfdom had almost entirely replaced agricultural slavery, and by then was itself dying out. Labour shortages caused by the mid-14th century Black Death were one factor that broke the serf system. Chattel slavery continued on the fringes of Christendom, and revived in the late Middle Ages and Renaissance, enslaving Muslims. As in other societies, new slaves were continually needed. The Reconquista wars provided Spain and Portugal with many captives, they still had significant numbers of slaves as the Age of Discovery began. England was relatively late to lose slavery, although it declined sharply after the Norman Conquest dissolved the Anglo-Saxon legal framework, and brought in more Church-influenced Norman governance. Over 10% of England's population entered in the Domesday Book in 1086 were slaves, far more than in France at the same date. Church bodies remained slave-owners even as church leaders fought new enslavement and the slave trade. As an administrative organization, the Church was conservative and forbade the alienation (loss) of church property. This, and the survival of church records, accounts for the final records of agricultural slaves in England for monastic properties in the =1120s, much later than in France, where they disappear from monastery records by the mid-9th century.

What is usually termed "the ransoming of captives" was one of the traditional Seven Acts of Mercy; this included slaves as well as prisoners of war, who could be held for ransom even though their enslavement was unacceptable. The Irish Council of Armagh (1171) decreed the liberation of all English slaves, but this was after, and specifically linked to, the Norman invasion of Ireland.

Christian people could be enslaved as a criminal punishment, for debt, or could sell themselves or their children. In 655 the Ninth Council of Toledo, in order to keep priests celibate, ruled that all children of clerics were to be enslaved. In 1089, Pope Urban II ruled at the Synod of Melfi that the wives of priests were to be enslaved.

.... disabilities of all kinds were enacted and as far as possible enforced against the wives and children of ecclesiastics. Their offspring were declared to be of servile condition .... The earliest decree in which the children were declared to be slaves, the property of the Church, and never to be enfranchised, seems to have been a canon of the Synod of Pavia in 1018. Similar penalties were promulgated later on against the wives and concubines (see the Synod of Melfi, 1189, can. xii), who by the very fact of their unlawful connection with a subdeacon or clerk of higher rank became liable to be seized as slaves ...

Laws sometimes stated that conversion to Christianity, especially by Muslim slaves, allowed emancipation, but as such conversions often resulted in the freed slave returning home and reverting to Islam. For example, the Crusader Kingdom of Jerusalem had such laws, but such provisions were often ignored and became less used.

=== Slavery in Canon Law ===
In the early thirteenth century, official support for some kinds of servitude was incorporated into Canon Law (Corpus Iuris Canonici), by Pope Gregory IX.

Slavery was imposed as an ecclesiastical penalty by General Councils and local Church councils and Popes, 1179–1535:

- Assisting Saracens 1179–1450 (Third Lateran Council, Canon 24)
- Selling Christian slaves to the Saracens (1425). Pope Martin V issued two constitutions. Traffic in Christian slaves was not forbidden, but their sale to non-Christian masters was.
- Brigandage in Pyrenees mountainous districts (Third Lateran Council, Canon 27)
- Unjust aggression or other crimes (1309–1535). Capture and enslavement for Christian families or cities or states was enacted several times by Popes. Those sentenced included Venetians in 1309.

During the War of the Eight Saints (1375–1378), Pope Gregory XI excommunicated all members of the government of Florence and placed the city under interdict, and legalized the arrest and enslavement of Florentines and the confiscation of their property throughout Europe.

== Aiding slaves ==
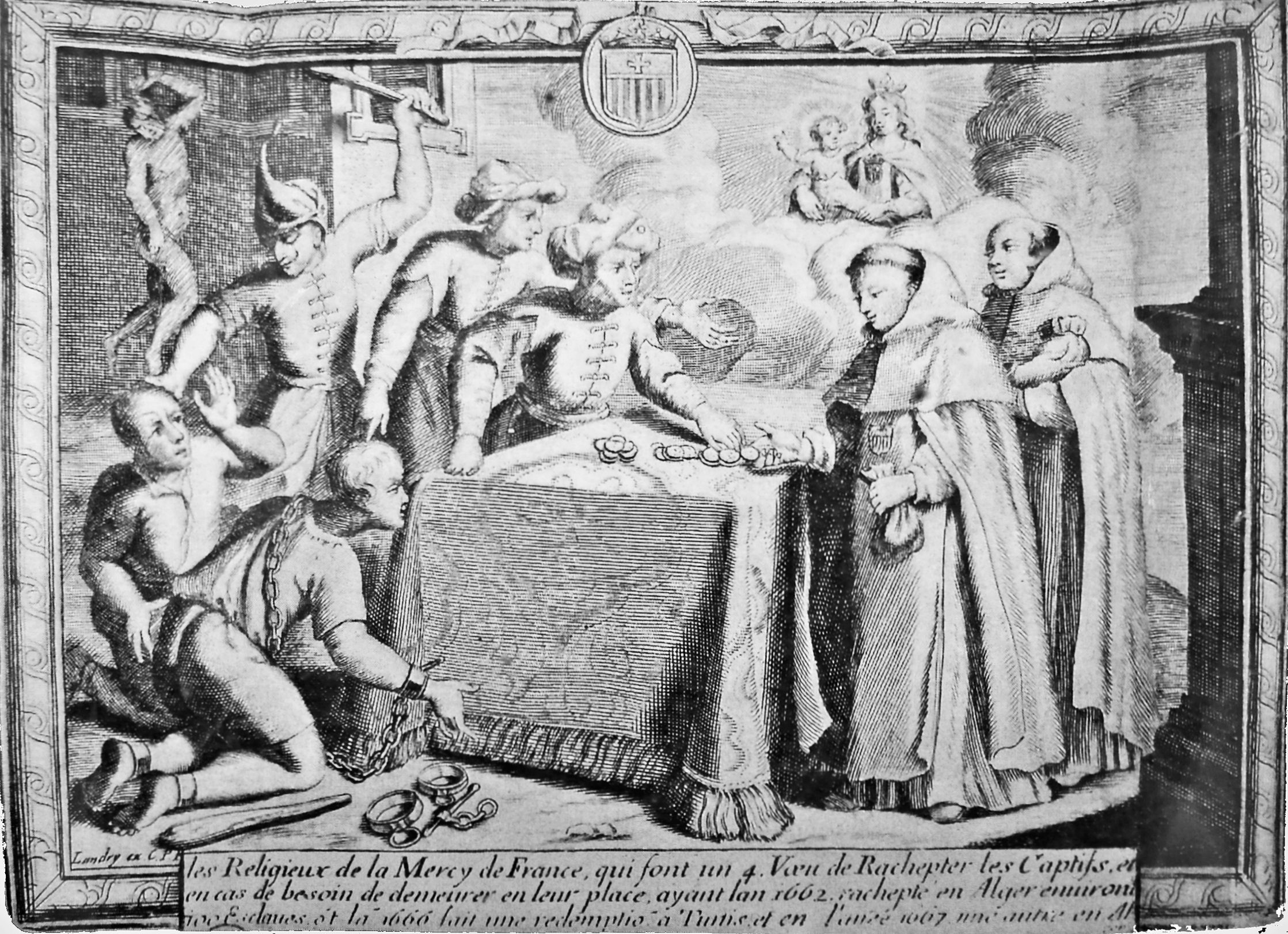
Redemption of Christian slaves by Catholic monks

The Church established a tradition of charitable aid to slaves, without necessarily challenging slavery itself. Saint Paul was the first of many authorities to say that slaves should be treated kindly, and that manumission (already common in Roman life) was encouraged, especially on the conversion or death of the owner. The Anglo-Saxon Synod of Chelsea (816) said that the death of a bishop should be marked by the enfranchisement (manumission) of the English who he enslaved; later pronouncements called for enfranchisement on such occasions, and there was a widespread tradition of such actions.

Enslaved Christian captives were a particular concern, and their trafficking to non-Christian owners was especially disgraceful, and was repeatedly forbidden. Many figures from the early medieval to Early Modern periods took part in buying Christian slaves from their non-Christian owners. One of the traditional Seven Acts of Mercy is given as the "ransoming of captives", but this originally meant slaves or prisoners of war, a distinction that mostly emerged during the Middle Ages.

The liberation of slaves is a common theme in early medieval hagiographies. The Frankish Saint Eligius, a goldsmith turned bishop, used his wealth to do so on a large scale, apparently including non-Christian slaves. Others used church funds as permitted by church councils. Queen Bathild (died 680), wife of Frankish king Clovis II and then regent for her son, was apparently an Anglo-Saxon relative of Ricberht of East Anglia, the last pagan king there, who was either captured by pirates or sold into slavery, probably when he was succeeded by Sigeberht, who soon converted to Christianity. She was apparently given to Clovis as a present, but emerged as his queen. She acted against the slave trade, forbidding slave exports and using her own money to manumit slaves, especially children.

Societies and clerical orders were founded to free Christian slaves. The best known of these were the Trinitarian Order and the Mercedarians. The Trinitarians were founded in France in 1198 by Saint John of Matha, with the original aim of ransoming captives in the Crusades. The Mercedarians are an order of friars founded in Barcelona in 1218 by Saint Peter Nolasco, whose particular original mission was the saving of Christian slave-captives in the wars between Christian Aragon and Muslim Spain (Al-Andalus). Both collected money to redeem captives, and organized the business of purchasing them, so that they were useful to families who already had the money.

French priest Saint Vincent de Paul (1581–1660) was captured by Barbary corsairs and enslaved for some years before escaping. He used his position as chaplain to the aristocrat in charge of the French galley fleet to run missions to the slaves and ameliorate their conditions, without seriously challenging the galley-slave system itself.

=== Wars against Muslims ===
The position of the Western Church that Christian captives could not be enslaved mirrored that in Islam, which had the same protocol regarding Muslims. In wars between the two religions, all captives were liable to be enslaved, as regularly happened in the Crusades and the Spanish Reconquista. Coastal Europe remained prey throughout the period to razzias or slaving raids by Barbary corsairs, which left many coastal areas unpopulated; isolated raids on England and Ireland continued as late as the 17th century. "As a consequence of the wars against the Mussulmans and the commerce maintained with the East, the European countries bordering on the Mediterranean, particularly Spain and Italy, once more had slaves: Turkish prisoners and also, unfortunately, captives imported by conscienceless traders .... this revival of slavery, lasting until the seventeenth century, is a blot on Christian civilization". Many medieval popes condemned Muslim enslavement of Christians. Several religious orders were organized to free them. No general condemnation of slavery or tied servitude was issued.

== Early modern period ==
By the end of the Middle Ages slavery had become rare in Northern Europe, but continued around the Mediterranean, where contact with non-Christian societies was more common. Some Italian maritime states continued the slave trade. The only Christian area where agricultural slaves were economically significant was the south of the Iberian Peninsula. Slaves from wars with Muslims, both in the Reconquista and Christian attempts to expand into North Africa, were augmented with slaves from sub-Saharan Africa. Spain and Portugal were the leaders in the Age of Discovery, and took slave-making to their territories in the Americas. The first African slaves arrived in the Spanish territory of Hispaniola in 1501.

=== Before Columbus ===
Europe had been aware since antiquity of the Canary Islands, 100 kilometres off Africa in the Atlantic. They were inhabited by the Guanches, a people related to Berber peoples. They lived without towns, long-range ships or writing, and had intermittent contacts with seafarers. In 1402 the Spanish invaded, island by island, in a serendipitous rehearsal for their New World conquests. The process lasted until the defeat of resistance in Tenerife in 1496, which was accompanied by the enslavement of large parts of the Guanche population. Distinct Guanche communities, language and culture then ceased to exist, although genetic studies find Guanche genes among modern Canarians. Church injunctions rejected the enslavement of the Guanches, but they had little effect. In 1435 Pope Eugene IV condemned slavery of Christians, including the Guanches, in Sicut Dudum.

Pope Pius II and Pope Sixtus IV also condemned the enslavement of Christians. Scholars point out that slavery continued, since Pius II's prohibition related only to those recently baptised. Pope Urban VIII confirmed this (7 October 1462, Apud Raynaldum in Annalibus Ecclesiasticis ad ann n.42), referring to those covered by the prohibitions of Pius II as "neophytes".

In 1454 Pope Nicholas V granted King Alfonso V "...the rights of conquest and permissions previously granted not only to the territories already acquired but also those that might be acquired in the future".

We [therefore] weighing all and singular the premises with due meditation, and noting that since we had formerly by other letters of ours granted among other things free and ample faculty to the aforesaid King Alfonso—to invade, search out, capture, vanquish, and subdue all Saracens, and other enemies of Christ wheresoever placed, and the kingdoms, dukedoms, principalities, dominions, possessions, and all movable and immovable goods whatsoever held and possessed by them and to reduce their persons to perpetual slavery, and to apply and appropriate to himself and his successors the kingdoms, dukedoms, counties, principalities, dominions, possessions, and goods, and to convert them to his and their use and profit...

In 1456, Pope Calixtus III confirmed these grants to the Kings of Portugal and they were renewed by Pope Sixtus IV in 1481. In 1514 Pope Leo X renewed and confirmed these documents.

These papal bulls served as justification for the subsequent era of slave trade and European colonialism. But there were various other papal bull condemnations of Spanish and Portuguese practices of slavery and slave raids in the Canary Islands and the New World in Sicut Dudum (1435) and Sublimis Deus (1537).

Despite the papal condemnations of slavery in the 15th and 16th centuries, Spain and Portugal were never explicitly forbidden from partaking in slavery, but did strongly contribute to the Valladolid debate.

In 1488, Pope Innocent VIII accepted the gift of 100 slaves from Ferdinand II of Aragon, and distributed those slaves to his cardinals and the Roman nobility.

=== Spanish New World ===
Ferdinand and Isabella requested the same Papal authority and permissions for the new lands that Portugal had received for West Africa. Accordingly, on 3 May 1493 Pope Alexander VI issued two bulls that extended the identical "favours, permissions, etc. granted to the Monarchy of Portugal in respect of West Africa to the Monarchy of Spain in respect of America.....and to reduce their persons into perpetual slavery...wherever they may be".

Although the church was excited by the potential for conversions in the New World, the clergy there were often horrified by the methods used by the conquerors, and tensions between church and state grew rapidly. The encomienda system of forced/tenured labour, begun in 1503, often amounted to slavery. The Leyes de Burgos (or Laws of Burgos), were issued by Ferdinand II (Catholic) on 27 December 1512, and were the first rules created to control relations between the Spaniards and the indigenous people, but though intended to improve their treatment, they rather legalized and regulated the forced labour system. Under Charles V, the reformers gained sway, with Spanish missionary Bartolomé de las Casas as a leading advocate. His goal was the abolition of the encomienda system, which forced the natives to abandon their lifestyle and destroyed their culture. His role in the reform movement earned him the nickname, "Defender of the Indians". He was able to influence the king, leading to the New Laws of 1542. However these provoked a revolt by the conquistadors, led by Gonzalo Pizarro, Francisco Pizarro's half-brother, and the alarmed government weakened them in response. Continuing armed indigenous resistance, for example in the Mixtón War (1540–41) and the Chichimeca War of 1550 resulted in the full enslavement of thousands of captives, often beyond the control of the Spanish government.

The second Archbishop of Mexico (1551–72), the Dominican Alonso de Montúfar, wrote to the king in 1560 protesting the importation of Africans, and questioning the "justness" of enslaving them. Tomás de Mercado was a theologian and economist of the School of Salamanca who had lived in Mexico and whose 1571 Summa de Tratos y Contratos ("Manual of Deals and Contracts") rejected the morality of enslaving Africans, though he accepted "just-title" slaves in theory.

The Church's view on the African slave trade in Latin America mimicked that of the European trade, as in they did not view them as morally equal. The Church, however, mandated slaves to be baptized, given the sacraments, and allowed to attend mass. Slaveholders were required to give slaves the day of rest. Uniquely, in Latin America the Church made marriage a requirement and couples could not be forcefully separated.

Priests, nuns, and brotherhoods all controlled many slaves. For example, the largest convent in Mexico City bordered the slave market. The nuns purchased slaves for personal use and to tend to their convents. One revealing case of the Church's participation are lottery prizes from the Santa Casa da Misericordia in Brazil. Child slaves were auctioned off for Catholic Charity. Joaquim Nabuco, a Brazilian abolitionist, is quoted saying, "No priest ever tried to stop a slave auction; none ever denounced the religious regimen of the slave quarters. The Catholic Church, despite its immense power in a country still greatly fanaticized by it, never raised its voice in Brazil in favor of emancipation."

=== Requerimiento ===
The Spanish Requerimiento, in relation to the Spanish invasion the New World, was a legalistic proclamation required to be read to indigenous populations, demanding that local populations convert to Christianity, on pain of slavery or death, and intended to give legality to Spanish actions. This drew on centuries-old precedents, used in conflicts with Muslims and Guanches, and perhaps copying the Islamic dawah. The most famous version was used between 1510 and 1556, but others were used until the 18th century. It was introduced after Dominican friars accompanying the conquistadors protested to the Crown enslavement of the New World indigenous peoples. Comparing the situation to Spain's wars against the Moors, the clerics claimed that Muslims had knowledge of Jesus Christ and rejected him, so that waging a crusade against them was legitimate. In contrast, wars against the Native Americans, who had never had contact with Christianity, were unacceptable. As a response to this position, the Requerimiento provided a justification for such conquest, given their rejection of the "legitimate" authority of the Kings of Spain and Portugal, as granted by the Pope.

== 16th century ==
=== Slavery in Europe ===
Slavery in Europe, mainly around the Mediterranean, continued and was amplified by the larger size of Mediterranean navies used to combat the powerful Ottoman navy. The main type of Mediterranean naval ship, unlike the Atlantic and Northern seas, was the galley, rowed by galley-slaves; galleys declined only after about 1600. The navy of the Papal States was like that of Venice, France, Genoa and other naval powers. Galley slaves were recruited by criminal sentencing, usually for enough years that many never survived. Others were captured in war, mostly Muslims, and other supplied by the African slave-trade. Some Popes were personally involved in these activities. Ottoman admiral Turgut Reis was captured and made a Genoan galley slave for nearly four years before he was imprisoned and ransomed. After the battle of Lepanto approximately 12,000 Christian galley slaves were freed from the Turks.

In 1535 Pope Paul III removed the ability of slaves in Rome to claim freedom by reaching the Capitol Hill, although this was restored some years later. He legalized slave trading and ownership, including of Christian slaves in Rome.

In 1639 Pope Urban VIII forbade the slavery of the Indians of Brazil, Paraguay, and the West Indies, while purchasing non-Indian slaves for himself from the Knights of Malta, probably for Papal galleys. The Knights of Malta attacked pirates and Muslim shipping, and their base became a centre for enslaving captured North Africans and Turks. Malta remained a slave market until well into the late 18th century. It required a thousand slaves to equip its own galleys.

=== Sublimis Dei ===
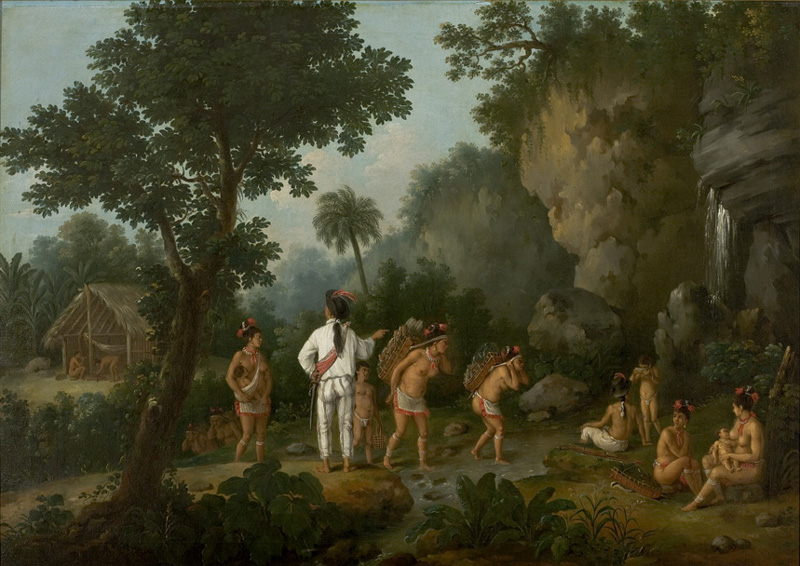
Amerindians labouring with overseer in Brazil, 1820s. As with many such pictures, their status cannot be determined from the image alone.

In the bull Sublimus Dei (1537), Pope Paul III prohibited the enslavement of indigenous Americans, declaring that they "should not be deprived of their liberty":

...The exalted God loved the human race so much that He created man in such a condition that he was not only a sharer in good as are other creatures, but also that he would be able to reach and see face to face the inaccessible and invisible Supreme Good... Seeing this and envying it, the enemy of the human race, who always opposes all good men so that the race may perish, has thought up a way, unheard of before now, by which he might impede the saving word of God from being preached to the nations. He (Satan) has stirred up some of his allies who, desiring to satisfy their own avarice, are presuming to assert far and wide that the Indians...be reduced to our service like brute animals, under the pretext that they are lacking the Catholic faith. And they reduce them to slavery, treating them with afflictions they would scarcely use with brute animals... by our Apostolic Authority decree and declare by these present letters that the same Indians and all other peoples - even though they are outside the faith - ...should not be deprived of their liberty... Rather they are to be able to use and enjoy this liberty and this ownership of property freely and licitly, and are not to be reduced to slavery...

The bull was accompanied by the Pastorale Officium, which attached a latae sententiae excommunication rescindable only by the Pope for those who attempted to enslave or rob the indigenous. Stogre (1992) noted that Sublimus Dei is not present in Denzinger, a compendium of the Church's teachings, and that the executing brief for it (Pastorale officium) was annulled the following year. Davis (1988) asserted that it was annulled due to a dispute with the Spanish crown. The Council of The West Indies and the Crown concluded that the documents broke their patronato rights and the Pope withdrew them, though they continued to circulate and be quoted by Las Casas and others who supported indigenous rights.

Falola (2007) contends that the bull related to New World populations and did not condemn the transatlantic slave trade. However, the bull did condemn the enslavement of all other people, seeming to indirectly condemn the transatlantic slave trade. The bull offered a significant defense of indigenous rights.

In a decree dated 18 April 1591 (Bulla Cum Sicuti), Pope Gregory XIV ordered reparations to be made by Catholics in the Philippines, to locals who had been forced into slavery by Europeans, and he commanded under pain of excommunication that all native slaves in the islands be set free.

In 1545, Paul repealed an ancient law that allowed slaves to claim their freedom under the Emperor's statue on Capitol Hill, in view of the number of homeless people and tramps in the city of Rome. The decree included those who had become Christians after their enslavement and those born to Christian slaves. The right of Romans to publicly buy and sell slaves of both sexes was affirmed.

"[we decree] that each and every person of either sex, whether Roman or non-Roman, whether secular or clerical, and no matter of what dignity, status, degree, order or condition they be, may freely and lawfully buy and sell publicly any slaves whatsoever of either sex, and make contracts about them as is accustomed to be done in other places, and publicly hold them as slaves and make use of their work, and compel them to do the work assigned to them....irrespective of whether they were made Christians after enslavement, or whether they were born in slavery even from Christian slave parents according to the provisions of common law."

Stogre (1992) contends that lifting restrictions was due to a shortage of slaves in Rome. In 1547 Pope Paul III sanctioned the enslavement of the Christian King of England, Henry VIII, in the aftermath of the execution of Sir Thomas More. In 1548 he authorized the purchase and possession of Muslim slaves in the Papal States.

== 17th century ==
The Jesuit reductions, highly organized rural settlements where Jesuit missionaries presided over Indian communities, were begun in 1609, and lasted until the 1767 suppression of the order in Spain. The Jesuits armed the Indians, who fought pitched battles with Portuguese Bandeirantes or slave-hunters. The Holy Office of the Inquisition was asked about the morality of enslaving innocent blacks. The practice was rejected, as was trading such slaves. Slaveholders, the Holy Office declared, were obliged to emancipate and compensate blacks unjustly enslaved.

== 18th century ==
In Compendium Institutionum Civilium, Cardinal Gerdil asserted that slavery is compatible with natural law and does not end equality between humans, insofar as slaves retain rights such as the right to humane treatment.

Pope Benedict XIV condemned the enslavement of Native Americans (indios, tanto cristianos como infieles in a Spanish translation) specifically in the Portuguese colonies, in his papal bull Immensa Pastorum Principis, issued in 1741.

== Towards abolition of slavery ==
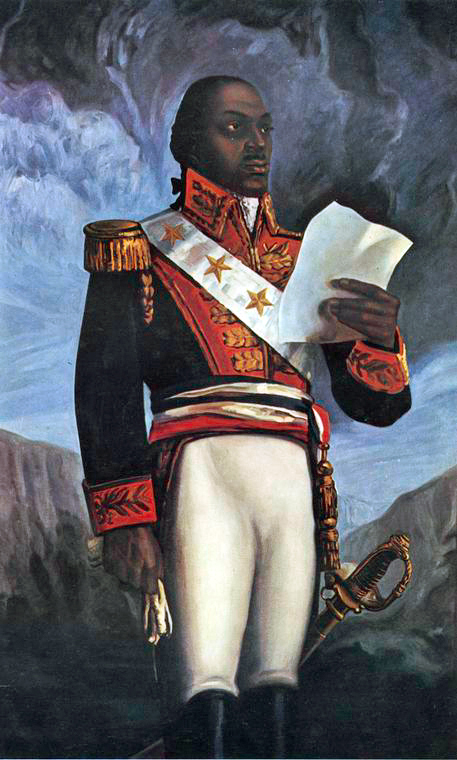
Toussaint L'Ouverture

The 18th century saw the massive expansion of the transatlantic slave trade. Around the end of the century, various abolitionist movements formed in Europe and the Americas with the stated aim of abolishing slavery and the slave trade. These movements were based on the Enlightenment and on Christian ethical principles; in the English-speaking countries many leading figures were non-conformist Protestants.

Notable anti-slavery French Catholic intellectuals included Montesquieu and later the radical priests Guillaume-Thomas Raynal and the Abbé Gregoire.

In 1761, the Marquis of Pombal published a decree that banned the importation of slaves and automatically freed any slaves brought to mainland Portugal. After 1773, every child born to an enslaved mother would be a free citizen. This didn't apply to the Portuguese colonies.

Legal cases such as Jean Boucaux v. Verdelin of 1738 and the Somersett's Case (1772) essentially ended slavery in the home countries, but did not extend to the colonies. The French Revolution, in which Raynal and Gregoire were notable figures, did not initially have emancipation as a goal. After failing to stamp out the Haitian Revolution, led by devout Catholic ex-slave Toussaint Louverture, and alarmed by British attempts to link up with slave rebels, in 1794 the French abolished slavery in all French territories. Napoleon reversed this when he took power.

The British followed in 1807 with the Slave Trade Act 1807, which outlawed international slave-trafficking, but not slave-owning, which remained legal in the British Empire until the Slavery Abolition Act 1833. From 1807 the British began to use their naval power and diplomatic pressure to lead the international movement eradicating international slave-trafficking, which was almost entirely successful.

In 1810, Mexican Father Miguel Hidalgo y Costilla, who also became the Father of the Mexican nation, declared slavery abolished, but this was not official until the Mexican War of Independence finished.

Pope Pius VII joined the declaration of the Congress of Vienna, in 1815, urging the suppression of the slave trade. By now the major opposition to this came from Spain and Portugal, who required a steady supply of new slaves. In the United States, the slave population was able to reproduce itself, and many slave-owners accepted the end of the slave trade.

Pius wrote letters to the restored King of France in 1814 and the King of Portugal in 1823 urging the same thing. By now the Papacy was under pressure from the British government, because British support was needed at the Congress of Vienna for the restoration of the Papal States.

Maxwell (1975) concluded that "In Catholic countries the abolition of slavery has been due mainly to humanist influences". Sturzo argued that the change in attitude to slavery among Christian thinkers followed its abolition rather than preceding it.

=== In supremo apostolatus ===
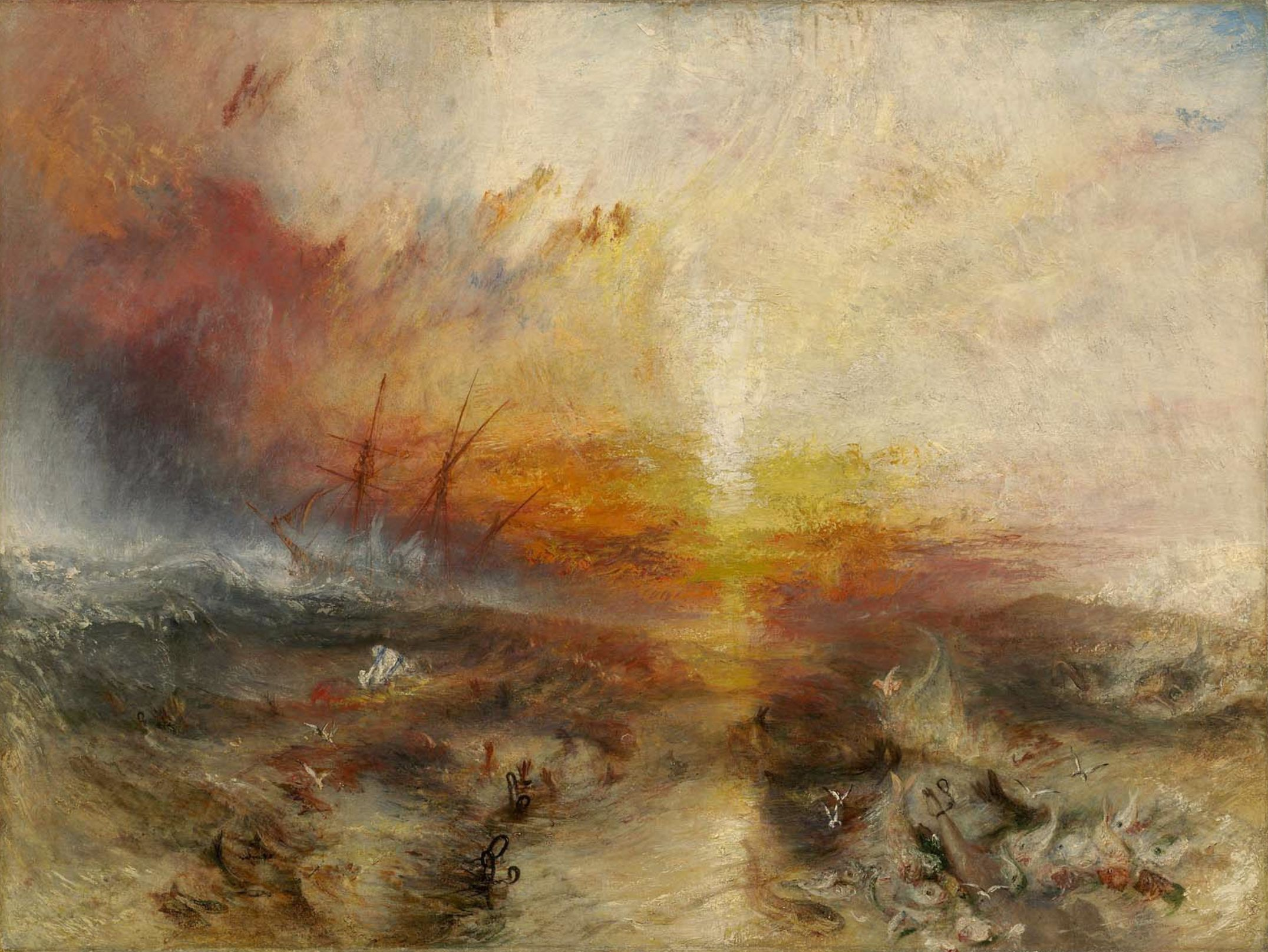
Slavers throwing overboard the Dead and Dying — Typhoon coming on, J. M. W. Turner, 1840

In 1839, Pope Gregory XVI issued a bull, with the incipit In supremo apostolatus in which he condemned slavery, with particular reference to New World slavery and the slave trade, calling it "inhumanum illud commercium". The exact meaning and scope of the Bull was disputed at the time, and remains so. New enslavements and slave trading were clearly and absolutely forbidden. However, the language in the passage quoted below and other passages was not sufficiently specific to make clear what, if anything, the bull had to say about the ongoing ownership of those already enslaved, although their sale appeared to be prohibited. No clear call for the emancipation of existing slaves was included, as had already happened in the British and French Empires.

"We, by apostolic authority, warn and strongly exhort... that no one in the future dare to bother unjustly, despoil of their possessions, or reduce to slavery Indians, Blacks or other such peoples... We prohibit and strictly forbid any Ecclesiastic or lay person from presuming to defend as permissible this trade in Blacks under no matter what pretext or excuse, or from publishing or teaching in any manner whatsoever, in public or privately, opinions contrary to what We have set forth in these Apostolic Letters" (In supremo apostolatus, 1839).

The ambiguity in the text allowed some Catholics, including some bishops in the United States and elsewhere, to continue to say that slave-owning was permitted by the church, while others claimed that it was a general condemnation. Theologically, the position of the church remained unchanged: slavery was not intrinsically evil. John Henry Newman, in a letter to fellow convert Thomas William Allies, disagreed with him that slavery was intrinsically evil and instead compared slavery to despotism. Stating that neither is intrinsically evil, so though he believed St. Paul would have ended both if he could, he was not bound to try, as he could not. He claimed that slavery was not per se a sin and that some good could come of it. It was not until the last Catholic country to retain legal slavery, Brazil, abolished it in 1888, that the Vatican pronounced definitively against slavery as such.

=== Pope Leo XIII ===
By 1890, slavery was no longer a significant issue for governments of most Christian states. The church debated the common Catholic teaching on slavery, in the main founded on Roman civil law, and whether it could be subject to change. In 1888, Pope Leo XIII issued a letter to the Bishops of Brazil, In plurimis, and another in 1890, Catholicae Ecclesiae (On Slavery in the Missions). In these letters, the Pope praised twelve previous Popes who had made determined efforts to abolish slavery. Maxwell (1975) noted that Leo did not mention conciliar or Papal documents, nor canons of Church Law that had previously sanctioned slavery. Five Popes praised by Leo issued documents that authorized slavery as an institution, as a penalty for ecclesiastical offences, or when arising through war. No distinction is made in Pope Leo's letters between "just" and "unjust" slavery and was interpreted as a condemnation of the slavery institution, though other Catholic moral theologians continued to teach up until the middle of the twentieth century that slavery was not intrinsically wrong. C. R. Boxer addressed this, referring to sources not cited by Maxwell.

=== United States ===
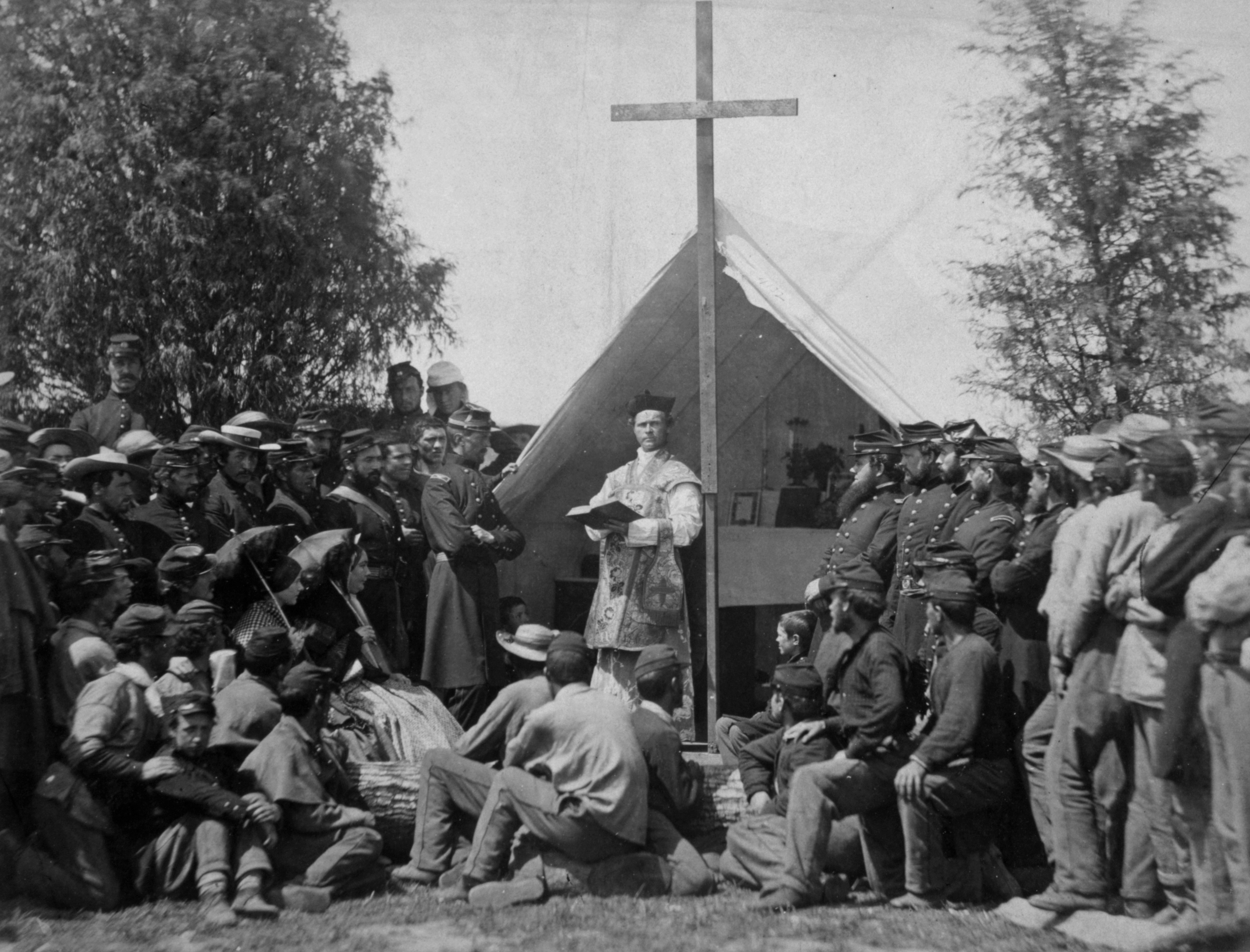
A Catholic Union army chaplain at a Mass during the American Civil War

Catholic slavery in what would become the United States began in the Spanish colony of the Virgin Islands in the 1490s. In Puerto Rico, African slaves first arrived in the early 16th century. Later, in 1526, slaves were brought to the short-lived colony of San Miguel de Gualdape, where North America's first slave rebellion occurred. Mission Nombre de Dios was founded in 1565 in what would become Florida, and also involved Catholic African slaves. No rebellion occurred there, but the city (St. Augustine, Florida) eventually became a haven for runaways willing to convert to Catholicism and join the Spanish military. This is thought to have been a factor in the events of the Catholic Stono Rebellion in South Carolina in 1739, which involved slaves who planned to march to freedom in La Florida, and the New York Conspiracy of 1741.

After the founding of the United States, two slaveholding states, Maryland and Louisiana, had large contingents of Catholic residents. Both states had the largest numbers of freed slaves. The Archbishop of Baltimore, John Carroll, had two black servants—one free and one enslaved. (He is alleged to have been related to a slave descendant, Sister Anne Marie Becraft.)

In 1820, the Jesuits had nearly 400 slaves on their Maryland plantations who worked on the community's farms. Realizing that their properties were more profitable if rented to tenant farmers rather than worked by enslaved people, the Jesuits began selling off their bondsmen in 1837. One notable example of this was the sale of 272 slaves by the Jesuit Maryland Province in 1838.

Although Louisiana was a slaveholding state, it also held one of the US' largest populations of former slaves. Most lived in New Orleans and the southern part of the state (Louisiana's Catholic region). More than in other areas of the South, free blacks in New Orleans were middle class and well-educated; many were property owners.

Catholics only started to become a significant part of the overall US population in the 1840s with the arrival of Irish, German, and Southern Italian immigrants who congregated in urban Northern free areas.

Some American bishops interpreted In supremo as condemning the slave trade, but not slavery. Bishop John England of Charleston wrote several letters to the Secretary of State under President Martin Van Buren explaining that the Pope, in In supremo, condemned the slave trade, but not slavery per se.

In In supremo apostolatus, Pope Gregory XVI admonished and adjured "all believers in Christ, of whatsoever condition, that no one hereafter may dare unjustly to molest Indians, Blacks, or other men of this sort;...or to reduce them to slavery...". Catholic bishops in the Southern U.S. focused on the word "unjustly". They argued that the Pope did not condemn slavery if the enslaved individuals had been captured justly—that is, they were either criminals or prisoners of war.

Answering the charge that Catholics were widely supporting the abolitionist movement, Bishop England noted the slavery/slave trade distinction. To prove this England had In supremo translated and published in his diocesan newspaper, The United States Catholic Miscellany, and wrote a series of 18 letters to John Forsyth, Van Buren's Secretary of State, to explain how he and most other American bishops interpreted In supremo apostolatus.

Daniel O'Connell, the Catholic leader of the Irish in Ireland, supported the abolition of slavery in the British Empire and in America. Garrison recruited him to the abolitionist cause. O'Connell, black abolitionist Charles Lenox Remond, and temperance priest Theobald Mathew organized a petition with 60,000 signatures urging Irish immigrants to support abolition. O'Connell also spoke in the United States for abolition.

One outspoken critic of slavery was Archbishop John Baptist Purcell of Cincinnati, Ohio. In an 1863 Catholic Telegraph editorial Purcell wrote:

When the slave power predominates, religion is nominal. There is no life in it. It is the hard-working laboring man who builds the church, the school house, the orphan asylum, not the slaveholder, as a general rule. Religion flourishes in a slave state only in proportion to its intimacy with a free state, or as it is adjacent to it.

His brother Fr. Edward Purcell was also very outspoken against the slavery. He served as editor of the Catholic Telegraph and published many works condemning slavery namely during the Civil War.

Between 1821 and 1836 when Mexico opened up its Texas territory to American settlers, many had problems bringing their slaves into Catholic Mexico (which did not allow slavery).

During the Civil War, Bishop Patrick Neeson Lynch was named by Confederacy President Jefferson Davis to be its delegate to the Holy See to maintain diplomatic relations. Despite Bishop Lynch's mission, and an earlier mission by Ambrose Dudley Mann, the Vatican never recognized the Confederacy, and the Pope received Bishop Lynch only in his ecclesiastical capacity.

William T. Sherman, a prominent Union general during the Civil War, was a baptized Catholic whose son became a priest, but who disavowed Catholicism after the war ended. Sherman's military campaigns of 1864 and 1865 freed many slaves, who joined his marches through Georgia and the Carolinas in the tens of thousands, although his personal views on the rights of African Americans and the morality of slavery were more nuanced. George Meade, the Union General who was victorious at the Battle of Gettysburg, was baptized as a Catholic in infancy, though it is not clear whether he practiced that religion.

=== Ethiopians ===
In 1866 the Holy Office issued an Instruction (signed by Pope Pius IX) in reply to questions from Guglielmo Massaia, the Vicar Apostolic of the Galla in the Ethiopian Empire: "... slavery itself, considered as such in its essential nature, is not at all contrary to the natural and divine law, and there can be several just titles of slavery and these are referred to by approved theologians and commentators of the sacred canons. For the sort of ownership that a slave-owner has over a slave is understood as nothing other than the perpetual right of disposing of the work of a slave for one's own benefit—services which it is right for one human being to provide for another. From this, it follows that it is not contrary to the natural and divine law for a slave to be sold, bought, exchanged or donated, provided that in this sale, purchase, exchange or gift, the due conditions are strictly observed which the approved authors likewise describe and explain. Among these conditions, the most important ones are that the purchaser should carefully examine whether the slave who is put up for sale has been justly or unjustly deprived of his liberty, and that the vendor should do nothing which might endanger the life, virtue or Catholic faith of the slave who is to be transferred to another's possession."

The statement may have been triggered by the passage of the 13th Amendment in the US or that it referred only to a "particular situation in Africa to have slaves under certain conditions," and not necessarily to the situation in the U.S. Maxwell (1975) wrote that this document sets out a contemporary theological exposition of morally legitimate slavery and slave trading.

== 1900 - present ==
The Vatican II document Gaudium et spes (Pastoral Constitution on the Church in the Modern World) stated, "Whatever violates the integrity of the human person, such as mutilation, torture...whatever insults human dignity, subhuman living conditions, arbitrary imprisonment, deportation, slavery ... the selling of women and children; as well as disgraceful working conditions, where men are treated as mere tools for profit, rather than as free and responsible persons; all these things and others of their like are infamies indeed ... they are a supreme dishonor to the Creator."

Nevertheless, some Catholic Church institutions continued to be linked with forced labour throughout the 20th century. In Ireland, up to 30,000 women were subjected to forced labour at the Magdalene Laundries from 1922 to 1996. Magdalene asylums in Ireland were not limited to Catholics, however, and the Protestant Bethany Home suffered from abuses.

In 2002 Archbishop of Accra Charles G. Palmer-Buckle apologized on behalf of Africans for the part Africans played in the slave trade. The apology was accepted by Bishop John Ricard of Pensacola-Tallahassee.

== Critical Views and Debate ==
As made evident below, it is debated among researchers and writers whether the Catholic Church changed teachings under the criteria of “faith and morals” to fit with social mores or not.

Cardinal Avery Dulles observed:

- For many centuries the Church was part of a slave-holding society.
- Popes held slaves, including hundreds of Muslim captives to man galleys.
- Aquinas, Luther, and Calvin were all Augustinian on this point. Aquinas taught that although the subjection of one person to another (servitus) was not part of the primary intention of natural law, it was appropriate and socially useful in a world impaired by original sin.
- No Father or Doctor of the Church was an unqualified abolitionist.
- No pope or council ever made a sweeping condemnation of slavery as such.
- Church leaders sought to alleviate the evils of slavery and repeatedly denounced the mass enslavement of conquered populations and the slave trade, thereby undermining slavery at its sources.

In a modern work that denies any fundamental change in the Church's teaching over the centuries, Father Joel Panzer wrote:

The development of [the Church's teaching regarding slavery] over the span of nearly five centuries was occasioned by the unique and illicit form of servitude that accompanied the Age of Discovery. The just titles to servitude were not rejected by the Church, but rather were tolerated for many reasons. This in no way invalidates the clear and consistent teaching against the unjust slavery that came to prevail in Africa and the Western Hemisphere, first in Central and South America and then in the United States, for approximately four centuries.

The "servitude" that Panzer describes allows, subject to certain conditions, buying, selling, and exchange of human beings as described in the decree of 1866 and claimed that this was the teaching of Popes through the ages. Maxwell (1975) argued against a rigid understanding of Papal texts, and their immutability, noting that torture was once sanctioned by Papal decree. Pope John Paul II in 1995, "in the name of the whole Church", Catholicism forbade the selling of women and children. Hayes also reported a change in church teaching, which she dated to the 1880s.

Biorseth argued that "In all of recorded history, there is no such thing as a matter of faith and morals on which the Holy Catholic Church has ever changed its teaching." Maxwell asserted that it has been difficult for Catholic historians to write impartially on this subject. By way of example he noted texts of Pope Leo XIII who singled out for praise twelve previous Popes who worked to end slavery. Maxwell pointed out that five of the mentioned Popes actually authorized slavery, but suggests the error could be due to the Popes' "ghost writers". Hugh Thomas, author of The Slave Trade was critical of the New Catholic Encyclopedia through its "misleading" account of Papal condemnation of slavery. Maxwell described the situation as the historical "whitewashing" of the Church's involvement in slavery.

Father John Francis Maxwell published Slavery and the Catholic Church: The history of Catholic teaching concerning the moral legitimacy of the institution of slavery, the product of seven years of research. It recorded sanctions of slavery by Councils and Popes and also censures and prohibitions. He explained that what appears to the layman, not familiar with the intricacies of Church teaching and law, to be contradictory teaching, often involving the same Pope, is actually only a reflection of the common and longstanding concept of permissible just, and unjust slavery. He cited examples from Council and Papal documents that just slavery was an acceptable part of Catholic teaching until the end of the 19th century. Dulles disagreed, making distinctions among types of servitude.

Pope John Paul II in his encyclical Evangelium Vitae repeated a list of infamies that included slavery. He prefaced the passage in Gaudium es spes with "Thirty years later, taking up the words of the Council and with the same forcefulness I repeat that condemnation in the name of the whole Church, certain that I am interpreting the genuine sentiment of every upright conscience".

== Chronology of slavery-related Church acts ==
Papacy and Slavery - Chronological reference list
- Apostle Peter in 1 Peter 2:18-25 teaches Christian slaves to obey their masters, after the example of Jesus.
- Leo the Great decreed in 443 that no slave could become a priest.
- In the mid-fourth century Pope Julius I wrote that a slave could not be divorced from their spouse.
- The Pastoral Rule of Gregory I “The Great”, reigned 590-604, directed that slaves should behave humbly as they are only slaves but that Masters, like their slaves, were also slaves of God. He also commended the act of manumission for those who had been condemned jus gentium to slavery. Gregory wrote to a military governor in Africa to request a delivery of prisoners of war for enslavement in the service of the poor in Rome.
- Pope Urban II in 1089 at the Synod of Melfi granted to princes the power to enslave the wives of clerics to enforce clerical celibacy.
- Alexander III in 1174 appealed to the Moorish King of Valencia for the release of prisoners of war on the basis that they were Christians.
- Between 1309 and 1535 various States, Cities and families were subject to the penalty of enslavement by Popes. Examples include the Florentines in 1376, the Venetians (1309, 1283 and 1509) and the Colonna family in 1535.
- In March 1425 Pope Martin V issued a bull threatening excommunication for Christian slave dealers and ordered Jews to wear a "badge of infamy" to deter, in part, the buying of Christians. Ten black slaves were presented as a gift to Martin by Prince Henry of Portugal in 1441. In 1452 Martin V condemned those who purchased Greek rite Christians and sold them to non-Christians. Only the sale to non-Christians was forbidden.
- Pope Eugenius IV in 1433 and 1435 (Sicut Dudum) imposed the penalty of excommunication on those who enslaved recent converts in the Canary Islands. Eugenius tempered Sicut Dudum with another bull (15 September 1436) due to complaints by King Duarte of Portugal, now allowing the Portuguese to conquer any unconverted parts of the Canary Islands. Christians would be protected by the earlier edict but the un-baptized were implicitly allowed to be enslaved.
- Nicholas V in 1452 authorized King Alfonso V of Portugal to “invade, search out, capture and subjugate the Saracens and Pagans and any other unbelievers and enemies of Christ wherever they may be, as well as their kingdoms, duchies, counties, principalities, and other property...and to reduce their persons into perpetual slavery”. This was reconfirmed by Nicholas in 1454.
- In 1456 Calixtus III extended the grants of Nicholas V to the Kings of Portugal and applied the penalty of excommunication to those who had enslaved some Christians along with Muslims during raids on the Turkish and Egyptian coasts.
- Pius II in 1462 decreed ecclesiastical censures for those enslaving the recently baptised of Guinea. Slavery itself was not condemned.
- In 1476 Sixtus IV anathematized those who were enslaving the Christian converts in the Canary Islands. He renewed the grants of Nicholas V in 1481.
- Innocent VIII in 1488 distributed amongst the clergy a share of the hundred slaves he received as gift from King Ferdinand. He was advised by King Jao in 1488 that slave trade profits were helping to finance wars against Muslims in North Africa.
- Alexander VI in 1493 granted to Spain the same rights to the Americas as had been granted to Portugal for Africa by Nicholas V in 1454.
- Pope Leo X in his bull of 1513 regularized the procedure for baptising slaves who were about to die on slave ships. He described the enslavement of Indians as an offense against Christianity and nature, however “there would certainly have been one or two [black] slaves from the coast of Guinea in the Vatican in his day”.
- In 1514 Leo X repeated all the grants of Nicholas V.
- Pope Paul III in 1535 sentenced King Henry VIII to capture and enslavement.
- In May 1537 Paul III followed the lead given by the Spanish crown and banned under pain of excommunication the enslavement of Indians whom he declared to be human beings. King Charles V objected since it “was injurious to the Imperial right of colonization and harmful to the peace of the Indies” so Paul annulled the executive brief decree associated with the bull in June 1538.
- In 1535 Paul III renewed the ancient privilege of the magistrates to emancipate slaves who fled to the Capital after it had lapsed. After appeals from the magistrates Paul revoked the privilege in 1548 and declared it lawful to hold and trade slaves in Rome including Christians.
- Pius V in 1566 restored to the magistrates of Rome the right to emancipate slaves who fled to the Capital under an ancient privilege.
- Pius V in 1571 excommunicated those who were enslaving Christians to serve as galley-slaves.
- Pope Sixtus V, as a sign of appreciation, allowed Fernando Jimenez (the most important slave merchant in the mid-sixteenth century) to use his own surname, contrary to the normal restrictions applied to Jews of the period.
- Following a Royal Edict Pope Gregory XIV 1591 ordered the emancipation of all Indian slaves held by the Spanish in the Philippines under pain of excommunication. The prohibitions of Paul III and Gregory XIV were not applicable to “just” enslavement, e.g. those considered enemies.
- In 1629 Pope Urban VIII authorized the purchase of forty privately owned slaves who were serving in the galleys of the Papal fleet. In 1639 he condemned slavery of Indians, but not black Africans, without qualification in a letter (Immensa”) to his representative in Portugal.
- Pope Alexander VII in 1661 sought to purchase 100 slaves for the Papal galleys.
- Innocent X in 1645 authorized the purchase of 100 Turkish slaves to serve in the Papal galleys.
- Clement XI directed the Holy Office to appeal to his nuncios in Madrid and Lisbon to act in ending slavery.
- Pope Benedict XIV in 1741 condemned the unjust enslavement of Indians, Christian and non-Christian, and repeated the censures of Paul III and Urban VIII.
- In 1839 Gregory XVI condemned the unjust trade in black Africans as unchristian and morally unlawful. Unlike the censures of Paul III, Gregory XIV and Benedict XIV relating to Indians, no penalty of excommunication was specified.
- Leo XIII in 1888 and 1890 praised 12 past Popes who sought to abolish slavery with no mention of just or unjust enslavement. Five of the Popes mentioned were authors of public documents that sanctioned enslavement either as an institution, for ecclesiastical transgressions, or as a result of war.
- In 1995 Pope John Paul II repeated the condemnation of "infamies", including slavery, issued by the Second Vatican Council: "Thirty years later, taking up the words of the Council and with the same forcefulness I repeat that condemnation in the name of the whole Church, certain that I am interpreting the genuine sentiment of every upright conscience..”
Local church councils and slavery - chronological reference list
- The Council of Gangra (340 AD) anathematized anyone who taught that it was permissible for a slave to withdraw his services from the master who owned him on religious grounds. This decree became part of the Western Church’s collection of canons for the subsequent 1,400 years.
- In 419 the Council of Carthage decreed that not even an enfranchised slave could give evidence in a court of law.
- The Council of Agde in 506 AD decreed that Bishops could not sell slaves owned by the Church.
- In 517 AD the Council of Jena decreed that slaves bestowed on monastic orders could not be emancipated.
- The Council of Orleans in 541 AD decreed that slaves who were emancipated by a Bishop would be allowed to remain free so long as they remained in the service of the Church.
- At the 2nd Council of Macon in 585 AD, Bishops were instructed to defend the freedom of former slaves who had been legitimately emancipated in Church.
- In 633 AD it was decreed by the 4th Council of Toledo that women who were having “forbidden relationships” with clerics were to be put up for sale as slaves and that the clerics do penance.
- The 9th Council of Toledo in 655 AD decreed that the penalty of enslavement was not to be applied to priests who violated clerical celibacy rules but rather their children who would thereafter be forever slaves of the Church. This decree became part of the collection of Canons of the Western Church.
- The 816 Synod of Chelsea in Saxon England decreed that at the death of every Bishop, all English slaves he owned were to be freed, with each Abbot or Bishop who attended his funeral having to emancipate three slaves and give to each three solidi.
- In 817 AD the Council of Aachen used a previous teaching of St. Isidore of Seville to affirm the justice of enslavement. The Council of Pavia in 1012 AD enacted a similar decree, but included those children who were born of free women.
- Pope Urban II in 1089 at the Synod of Melfi granted to princes the power to enslave the wives of clerics in order to enforce clerical celibacy.
- In 1117 AD the Council of Armagh decreed that all English slaves in Ireland should be emancipated.
- The 3rd General Council of the Lateran (1179 AD) decreed the penalty of enslavement on any Christian who provided material aid to for the repair of Saracen ships or provided navigational assistance. This penalty was subsequently repeated at three other General Councils. The same Council decreed enslavement as a penalty for anyone involved with brigandage in the Pyrenees.
- The Fifth Lateran Council (1512–1517) regularised the procedure for baptizing slaves who were about to die in transit on slave ships.
- In 1965 the Second Vatican Council described slavery, without qualification, as an infamy that dishonored the Creator and poisoned human society.
Ecumenical church councils and slavery - chronological reference list
- The Third Council of the Lateran (1179 AD) decreed the penalty of enslavement on any Christian who provided material aid to for the repair of Saracen ships or provided navigational assistance. This penalty was repeated at three other General Councils. The same Council decreed enslavement as a penalty for anyone involved with brigandage in the Pyrenees.
- The Fifth Lateran Council (15th century) regularised the procedure for baptizing slaves who were about to die in transit on slave ships.
- In 1965 the Second Vatican Council described slavery, without qualification, as an infamy that dishonored the Creator and poisoned human society.

== See also ==
- Slavery and religion
- History of slavery
- Christian views on slavery
- Islamic views on slavery
- Slavery in ancient Greece
- Slavery in ancient Rome
- Slavery in antiquity
- Slavery in medieval Europe
- The Bible and slavery
- Judaism and slavery

== Sources ==
- Bermejo, Luis M. (1998). Infallibility on Trial: Church, Conciliarity and Communion. Christian Classics. ISBN 978-0-87061-190-2.
- Clarence-Smith, W. G. "Religions and the abolition of slavery - a comparative approach" (PDF).
- Curran, Robert Emmett (2012). Shaping American Catholicism: Maryland and New York, 1805–1915. Washington, D.C.: Catholic University of America Press. doi:10.2307/j.ctt284vw2. ISBN 978-0-8132-1967-7. JSTOR j.ctt284vw2.
- Daniel-Rops, Henri (1957). Cathedral and Crusade: Studies of the Medieval Church 1050–1350. Dutton.
- Davis, David Brion (2008). The Problem of Slavery in Western Culture. Oxford University Press. ISBN 978-0-19-505639-6.
- Epstein, Steven A. (1991). Wage Labor and Guilds in Medieval Europe. University of North Carolina Press. ISBN 978-0-8078-1939-5.
- Fiedler, Maureen; Rabben, Linda, eds. (1998). Rome Has Spoken...: A Guide to Forgotten Papal Statements, and How They Have Changed Through the Centuries. Crossroad Publishing Company. ISBN 978-0-8245-1774-8.
- Herbert, Gary B. (2002). A Philosophical History of Rights. New Brunswick, NJ: Transaction. ISBN 0-7658-0124-8.
- Jarrett, Bede (1968). Social theories of the Middle Ages 1200-1500. London: Frank Cass and Company. ISBN 0-7146-1327-4. originally printed 1926
- Lewis, Bernard (1992). Race and Slavery in the Middle East, New York: Oxford University Press, ISBN 0-19-505326-5.
- Kellerman, Christopher J. (2022). All Oppression Shall Cease: A History of Slavery, Abolitionism, and the Catholic Church. Orbis. ISBN 978-1-62698-489-9.
- McKivigan, John R.; Snay, eds. (1998). Religion and the Antebellum Debate over Slavery. University of Georgia Press. ISBN 978-0-8203-2076-2.
- Maxwell, John Francis (1975). Slavery and the Catholic Church: The history of Catholic teaching concerning the moral legitimacy of the institution of slavery. Barry Rose Publishers [for] the Anti-Slavery Society for the Protection of Human Rights. ISBN 978-0-859-92015-5.
- Meade, Teresa A History of Modern Latin America 1800 to the Present, United Kingdom, John Wiley & Sons Inc. 2016. Print.
- Nioh, Ambe J. (2006). Tradition, Culture, and Development in Africa: Historical Lessons for Modern Development Planning. Ashgate Publishing. ISBN 978-0-7546-4884-0.
- Noonan, John T. Jr. (2005). A Church That Can and Cannot Change: The Development of Catholic Moral Teaching. University of Notre Dame Press. ISBN 978-0-268-03604-1.
- Pagels, Elaine (1989). Adam, Eve, and the Serpent: Sex and Politics in Early Christianity. Vintage. ISBN 978-0-679-72232-8.
- Panzer, Joel S. (1996). The Popes and Slavery. Alba House. ISBN 978-0-8189-0764-7.
- Pelteret, David Anthony Edgell (2001). Slavery in Early Mediaeval England: From the Reign of Alfred Until the Twelfth Century. Boydell & Brewer. ISBN 978-0-85115-829-7.
- Caravaglios, Maria Genoino (1974). Unterkoefler, Ernest L. (ed.). The American Catholic Church and the Negro Problem in the XVIII-XIX Centuries. Charleston S.C.: Caravaglios.
- Saunders, A. (1982). A Social History of Black Slaves and Freedmen in Portugal 1441-1555. Cambridge University Press. ISBN 978-0-521-23150-3.
- Schreck, Alan (1999). The Essential Catholic Catechism. Servant Publications Nihil obstat, Imprimatur. ISBN 1-56955-128-6.
- Stogre, Michael (1992). That the world may believe: the development of Papal social thought on aboriginal rights. Sherbrooke: Éd. Paulines. ISBN 978-2-89039-549-7.
- Toyin Falola, Amanda Warnock, Encyclopedia of the middle passage, Greenwood Publishing Group, 2007, ISBN 0-313-33480-3
- J. F Maxwell, 1975, Slavery and the Catholic Church: The history of Catholic teaching concerning the moral legitimacy of the institution of slavery, Barry-Rose Publishers Online text
- Weithman, Paul J. (1992). "Augustine and Aquinas on Original Sin and the Function of Political Authority". Journal of the History of Philosophy. 30 (3): 353–376. doi:10.1353/hph.1992.0058. S2CID 33285873.

== Bibliography ==
- Henderson, Lawrence W (1979). Angola: five centuries of conflict. Ithaca, NY: Cornell University Press. ISBN 0801412471.
- Noll, Mark (2006). The Civil War as a theological crisis. Chapel Hill, NC: The University of North Carolina Press. ISBN 978-0-8078-3012-3.
- Thomas, Hugh (1997). The Slave Trade: the story of the Atlantic slave trade, 1440–1870. New York: Simon & Schuster. ISBN 978-0-684-81063-8.
