= Henri Michelot =

French cartographer

Henri Michelot was a French cartographer and hydrographer of the late 17th and early 18th century. He is credited with sole or joint authorship of several influential cartographic works devoted to the Mediterranean.

Michelot is described in the title cartouche of several charts he produced as "Hydrographer and Pilot for the Royal Galleys" of France and he is closely associated with Marseille, France, which was the home base of the French Galley Corps during its peak in the 1680s to its demise in the 1740s. Michelot's importance stems from three sources: 1) the long experience and close association he had with the areas that he charted; the war-like iconography of the title cartouches on his later works, including depictions of captured Muslim slaves; and the influences of other historical events of that time such as the plague of Marseilles in 1720.

Early works by Michelot include two charts of the entire Mediterranean co-authored with Nicolas Therin (1689; engraved by Randon), possibly based on an earlier work by Francois Berthelot.

Later printed works attributed to Henry Michelot were published until the early 19th century.
