= François Berthelot =

François Berthelot, cartographer, hydrographer, and professor was one of a number of Marseille-based authors who extended man's knowledge of the Mediterranean Sea during the late 17th and early to mid 18th century. Other authors in this category include Henri Michelot, Laurens Bremond, Nicolas Therin, Joseph Roux (Senior and Junior (b. 1725) ) and Jacques Ayrouard.

Among François Berthelot's accomplishments are a four sheet map of the Mediterranean (1693) on which he is self-described as professor and hydrographer at the city of Marseilles. Berthelot also published a text on the theory of navigation in 1691.

== Bibliography ==
- Berthelot, Francois. "Nouvelle Carte de la Mer Mediterrannee Presentee a Messieurs les Maire, Echevins, et Deputez du Commerce de la Ville de Marseilles par leur tres humble Serviteur Francois Berthelot". Claude Randon engraver. Marseilles. 1693. BNF. (http://gallica.bnf.fr/ark:/12148/btv1b8490477g)
- Berthelot, François. "Abrégé de la navigation : contenant ce qui est nécessaire de sçavoir de la théorie de cet art pour conduire les bâtiments sur la Méditerranée, avec des explications touchant les erreurs attachées à la routine des navigateurs. Marseilles. 1691. BNF.
