= Slavery and religion =

Historically, slavery has been regulated, supported, or opposed on religious grounds.

In Judaism, Hebrew slaves were given a range of treatments and protections. They were to be treated as an extended family with certain protections, and they could be freed. They were property but could also own material goods.

Early Christian authors (except for Assyrian Christians who did not believe in slavery) maintained the spiritual equality of slaves and free persons while accepting slavery as an institution. Early modern papal decrees allowed the enslavement of the unbelievers, though popes denounced slavery from the fifteenth century onward. This denouncement of slavery did not discourage (for example) the diocese of the Anglican church from having an indirect involvement with the religious conversion of black slaves in Barbados, in which one of the main principles was the divine right of the master over the slave. In the eighteenth century, the abolition movement took shape among Christians across the globe, but various denominations did not prohibit slavery among their members into the nineteenth century. Enslaved non-believers were sometimes converted to Christianity, but elements of their traditional beliefs merged with their Christian beliefs.

Early Islamic texts encourage kindness towards slaves and manumission (legally freeing individual slaves), while recognizing slavery as an institution and permitting enslavement of non-Muslims imprisoned or bought beyond the borders of Islamic rule. Children born to slaves were also considered legally as slaves.

== Slavery in the Bible ==
The Genesis narrative about the Curse of Ham has often been held to be an aetiological story, giving a reason for the enslavement of the Canaanites. The word ham is very similar to the Hebrew word for hot, which is cognate with an Egyptian word (kem, which means black) and is used to refer to Egypt itself, in reference to the fertile black soil along the Nile valley. Although many scholars therefore view Ham as an eponym which is used to represent Egypt in the Table of Nations, a number of Christians throughout history, including Origen and the Cave of Treasures, have argued for the alternate proposition that Ham represents all black people, his name symbolising their dark skin colour; pro-slavery advocates, from Eutychius of Alexandria and John Philoponus, to American pro-slavery apologists, have therefore occasionally interpreted the narrative as a condemnation of all black people to slavery. A few Christians, like Jerome, even took up the racist notion that black people inherently had a soul as black as [their] body.

Slavery was customary in antiquity, and it is condoned by the Torah. The Bible uses the Hebrew term eved (עֶבֶד) to refer to slavery; however, eved has a much wider meaning than the English term slavery, and in several circumstances it is more accurately translated into English as servant. It was seen as legitimate to enslave captives obtained through warfare, but not through kidnapping. Children could also be sold into debt bondage, which was sometimes ordered by a court of law.

As with the Hittite Laws and the Code of Hammurabi, the Bible does set minimum rules for the conditions under which slaves were to be kept. These are written as condition statements reflective of bronze age law. A set of if/then parameters to account for specific transgressions. Slaves were to be treated as part of an extended family; they were allowed to celebrate the Sukkot festival, and expected to honour Shabbat. Israelite slaves could not be compelled to work with rigour, and debtors who sold themselves as slaves to their creditors had to be treated the same as a hired servant. If a master harmed a slave in one of the ways covered by the lex talionis, the slave was to be compensated by manumission; if the slave died within 24 to 48 hours, he or she was to be avenged (whether this refers to the death penalty or not is uncertain).

Israelite slaves were automatically manumitted after six years of work, and/or at the next Jubilee (occurring either every 49 or every 50 years, depending on interpretation), although the latter would not apply if the slave was owned by an Israelite and was not in debt bondage. Slaves released automatically in their 7th year of service, which did not include female slaves, or did, were to be given livestock, grain, and wine, as a parting gift (possibly hung round their necks). This 7th-year manumission could be voluntarily renounced, which would be signified, as in other Ancient Near Eastern nations, by the slave gaining a ritual ear piercing; after such renunciation, the individual was enslaved forever (and not released at the Jubilee). Non-Israelite slaves were always to be enslaved forever, and treated as inheritable property.

In New Testament books, including the First Epistle of Peter, slaves are admonished to obey their masters, as to the Lord, and not to men; and the Epistle to Philemon was used by both pro-slavery advocates as well as by abolitionists; in the epistle, Paul returns Onesimus, a fugitive slave, back to his master.

== Judaism ==
More mainstream forms of first-century Judaism did not exhibit such qualms about slavery, and ever since the second-century expulsion of Jews from Judea, wealthy Jews have owned non-Jewish slaves, wherever it was legal to do so; nevertheless, manumissions were approved by Jewish religious officials on the slightest of pretexts, and court cases concerning manumission were nearly always decided in favor of freedom, whenever there was uncertainty towards the facts.

The Talmud, a document of great importance in Judaism, made many rulings that made manumission easier and more likely:

- The costly and compulsory giving of gifts was restricted to the 7th-year manumission only.
- The price of freedom was reduced to a proportion of the original purchase price rather than the total fee of a hired servant and could be reduced further if the slave had become weak or sickly (and therefore less saleable).
- Voluntary manumission became officially possible, with the introduction of the manumission deed (the shetar shihrur), which was counted as prima facie proof of manumission.
- Verbal declarations of manumission could no longer be revoked.
- Putting phylacteries on the slave, or making him publicly read three or more verses from the Torah, was counted as a declaration of the slave's manumission.
- Extremely long term sickness, for up to four years in total, could not count against the slave's right to manumission after six years of enslavement.

Jewish participation in the slave trade itself was also regulated by the Talmud. Fear of apostasy lead to the Talmudic discouragement of the sale of Jewish slaves to non-Jews, although loans were allowed; similarly slave trade with Tyre was only to be for the purpose of removing slaves from non-Jewish religion. Other types of trade were also discouraged: men selling themselves to women, and post-pubescent daughters being sold into slavery by their fathers. Pre-pubescent slave girls sold by their fathers had to be freed-then-married by their new owner, or his son, when she started puberty; slaves could not be allowed to marry free Jews, although masters were often granted access to the services of the wives of any of their slaves.

According to the Talmudic law, killing a slave is punishable in the same way as killing a freeman, even if it was committed by the owner. While slaves are considered the owner's property, they may not work on Sabbath and holidays; they may acquire and hold property of the owner.

Several prominent Jewish writers of the Middle Ages took offense at the idea that Jews might be enslaved; Joseph Caro and Maimonides both argue that calling a Jew slave was so offensive that it should be punished by ex-communication. However, they did not condemn enslavement of non-Jews. Indeed, they argued that the biblical rule, that slaves should be freed for certain injuries, should actually only apply to slaves who had converted to Judaism; additionally, Maimonides argued that this manumission was real punishment of the owner, and therefore it could only be imposed by a court, and required evidence from witnesses. Unlike the biblical law protecting fugitive slaves, Maimonides argued that such slaves should be compelled to buy their freedom.

At the same time, Maimonides and other halachic authorities forbade or strongly discouraged any unethical treatment of slaves. According to the traditional Jewish law, a slave is more like an indentured servant, who has rights and should be treated almost like a member of the owner's family. Maimonides wrote that, regardless of whether a slave is Jewish or not, "The way of the pious and the wise is to be compassionate and to pursue justice, not to overburden or oppress a slave, and to provide them from every dish and every drink. The early sages would give their slaves from every dish on their table. They would feed their servants before sitting to their own meals... Slaves may not be maltreated of offended—the law destined them for service, not for humiliation. Do not shout at them or be angry with them, but hear them out." In another context, Maimonides wrote that all the laws of slavery are "mercy, compassion and forbearance".

== Christianity ==
Different forms of slavery were practiced by Christian societies for over 18 centuries. Although the freeing of slaves was considered an act of charity during the early history of Christianity, and although the Christian view that all people, including slaves, were equal, was a novel idea within the Roman Empire, the institution of slavery was rarely criticised. David Brion Davis writes that the "variations in early Christian opinion on servitude fit comfortably within a framework of thought that would exclude any attempt to abolish slavery as an institution". Indeed, in 340, the local Synod of Gangra condemned the Manicheans for urging that slaves should liberate themselves; with one of the 20 canons of the Synod declaring:

3) If anyone shall teach a slave, under the pretext of piety, to despise his master and to run away from his service, and not to serve his own master with good-will and all honor, let him be anathema.

A variation of the Canon would be adopted as Orthodox Catholic Law, during the 451 AD, Council of Chalcedon, as:

4) ... Every monk must be subject to his bishop, and must not leave his house except at his suggestion. A slave, however, can not enter the monastic life without the consent of his master.

Augustine of Hippo, who renounced his former Manicheanism, argued that slavery was part of the mechanism to preserve the natural order of things; John Chrysostom, who is regarded as a saint by Eastern Orthodoxy and Roman Catholicism, argued that slaves should be resigned to their fate, because by "obeying his master he is obeying God". but he also stated that "Slavery is the fruit of covetousness, of extravagance, of insatiable greediness" in his Epist. ad Ephes. As the Apostle Paul admonished the early Christians; "There is neither Jew nor Greek: there is neither bond nor free: there is neither male nor female. For you are all one in Christ Jesus". And in fact, even some of the first popes were once slaves themselves. Pope Gelasius I, in 492 AD, sanctioned heathens in Gaul could be enslaved, imported and sold by Jews, in Rome. Though in the following centuries Roman popes would ban the ownership of Christian slaves by Jews, Muslims, heathens, and other Christians, while the Catholic Council of London in 1102, issued a local blanket decree, though not a Church canon: "Let no one dare hereafter to engage in the infamous business, prevalent in England, of selling men like animals."

In 1452, Pope Nicholas V issued the papal bull Dum Diversas, which granted Afonso V of Portugal the right to reduce any "Saracens, pagans and any other unbelievers" to hereditary slavery. The approval of slavery under these conditions was reaffirmed and extended in his Romanus Pontifex bull of 1455. (This papal bull was issued in response to the wars which were triggered by the Fall of Constantinople in 1453) In 1488 Pope Innocent VIII accepted the gift of 100 slaves from Ferdinand II of Aragon and distributed those slaves to his cardinals and the Roman nobility. Also, in 1639 Pope Urban VIII purchased slaves for himself from the Knights of Malta.

In the 15th and 16th centuries, other popes denounced slavery as a great crime, including Pius II, Paul III, and Eugene IV. In 1639, Pope Urban VIII forbade slavery, as did Benedict XIV in 1741. In 1815, pope Pius VII demanded that the Congress of Vienna suppress the slave trade, and Gregory XVI condemned it again in 1839.

In addition, the Dominican friars who arrived in the Spanish settlement of Santo Domingo in 1510 strongly denounced the enslavement of the local Indians. Along with other priests, they opposed the mistreatment of the Indians and denounced it as unjust and illegal in an audience with the Spanish king as well as in an audience with the subsequent royal commission. As a response to this position, the Spanish monarchy's subsequent Requerimiento provided a religious justification for the enslavement of the local populations, on the pretext that they refused to convert to Roman Catholicism and therefore denied the authority of the pope.

Various interpretations of Christianity were also used to justify the practice of slavery. For example, some people believed that slavery was a punishment that was reserved for sinners. Some other Christian organizations were slaveholders. The eighteenth-century high-church Anglican Society for the Propagation of the Gospel in Foreign Parts owned the Codrington Plantation, in Barbados, which contained several hundred slaves, who were branded on their chests with the word Society. George Whitefield, who is famed for his sparking of the so-called Great Awakening of American evangelicalism, overturned a province-wide ban against slavery, and went on to own several hundred slaves himself. Yet Whitefield is remembered as one of the first evangelists who preached to the enslaved.

At other times, Christian groups worked against slavery. The seventh-century Saint Eloi used his vast wealth to purchase British and Saxon slaves in groups of 50 to 100 in order to set them free. The Quakers in particular were early leaders of abolitionism, and in keeping with this tradition they denounced slavery at least as early as 1688. In 1787 the Society for Effecting the Abolition of the Slave Trade was formed, and 9 of its 12 founding members were Quakers; William Wilberforce, an early supporter of the society, went on to push through the 1807 Slave Trade Act, striking a major blow against the Atlantic slave trade. Leaders of Methodism and Presbyterianism also vehemently denounced human bondage, convincing their congregations to do likewise; Methodists and Presbyterians subsequently made the repudiation of slavery a condition of membership.

In the Southern United States, however, support for slavery was strong; anti-slavery literature was prevented from passing through the postal system, and even the transcripts of sermons, by the famed English preacher Charles Spurgeon, were burned due to their censure of slavery. When the American Civil War broke out, slavery became one of the issues which would be decided by its outcome; the southern defeat led to a constitutional ban on slavery. Despite the general emancipation of slaves, members of fringe white groups like the Christian Identity movement, and the Ku Klux Klan (a white supremacist group) see the enslavement of Africans as a positive aspect of American history.

=== Americas ===
In the United States, Christians not only held views about the practice of slavery, they also held views on how slaves practiced their own form of Christianity. Prior to the work of Melville Herskovits in 1941, it was widely believed that all elements of African culture were destroyed by the enslavement experience. Since the publication of his work, scholarship has found that "Slave Christianity" existed as a patchwork of African and Christian religious traditions. The slaves brought a wide variety of religious traditions with them including African traditional religions and Islam.

During the early eighteenth century, Anglican missionaries who attempted to bring Christianity to slaves in the Southern Colonies often found themselves butting up against uncooperative masters and resistant slaves. An unquestionable obstacle to the acceptance of Christianity among slaves was their desire to continue to adhere to the religious beliefs and rituals of their African ancestors as much as possible. Missionaries who worked in the South were especially displeased with the slaves' retention of African practices such as polygamy and what they called idolatrous dancing. In fact, even black people who embraced Christianity in America did not completely abandon the religions of Africa. Instead, they engaged in syncretism, blending Christian influences with traditional African rites and beliefs. Symbols and objects, such as crosses, were conflated with charms which were carried by Africans in order to ward off evil spirits. Christ was interpreted as a healer, similar to the priests of Africa. In the New World, fusions of African spirituality and Christianity led to distinctly new practices within slave populations, including Louisiana Voodoo or Vodun in Haiti. Although African religious influences were also important among Northern blacks, the exposure to African religions was more intense in the South, where the percentage of the black population was higher.

There were, however, some commonalities across the majority of tribal traditions. Perhaps the primary source of understanding of tribal traditions was the commonly held belief that there was no separation of the sacred and the secular. All life was sacred and the supernatural was present in every facet and focus of life. Most tribal traditions highlighted this experience of the supernatural in ecstatic experiences of the supernatural which were brought on by ritual song and dance. Repetitious music and dancing were often used to bring on these experiences through the use of drums and chanting. These experiences were realized in the "possession" of a worshipper in which one is not only taken over by the divine but actually becomes one with the divine.

Echoes of African tribal traditions can be seen in the form of Christianity that was practiced by slaves in the Americas. The songs, dances, and ecstatic experiences of traditional tribal religions were Christianized and practiced by slaves in what is called the "Ring Shout." This practice was a major mark of African American Christianity during the slavery period.

Christianity was embraced by the slaves who lived in North America more gradually. Many colonial slaveholders feared that the baptism of their slaves would lead to their emancipation because the laws that concerned the status of Christian slaves who lived under British colonial rule were vague. Even after 1706, by which time many states had passed laws that stated that baptism would not alter a slave's status, slaveholders continued to believe that the catechization of slaves would not be a wise economic choice. Slaves usually had one day off each week, usually Sunday. They used that time to grow their own crops, dance and sing (doing such things on the Sabbath was frowned upon by most preachers), so there was little time for slaves to receive religious instruction.

During the antebellum period, slave preachers—enslaved or formerly enslaved evangelists—became instrumental in shaping slave Christianity. They preached a gospel that was radically different from the gospel that was preached by white preachers, who often used Christianity in an attempt to make slaves more complacent with their enslaved status. Instead of focusing on obedience, slave preachers placed a greater emphasis on the Old Testament, especially on the Book of Exodus. They likened the plight of the American slaves to the plight of the enslaved Hebrews of the Bible, instilling hope into the hearts of those who were enslaved. Slave preachers were instrumental in shaping the religious landscape of African Americans for decades to come.

== Islam ==
According to Bernard Lewis, slavery has been a part of Islam's history from its beginning. The Quran, like the Old and New Testaments, Lewis wrote, "assumes the existence of slavery". It attempts to regulate slavery and thereby implicitly accepts it. Muhammad and his Companions owned slaves, and some of them acquired slaves through conquests. However, some argue that Muhammad never owned any slaves himself. He also advised people to free their slaves. One of Muhammad's followers was Zayd ibn Haritha, a slave who Muhammad freed and adopted as his son.

During the early history of Islam, the Classic practice of slavery was not forbidden, but the latter (Islam) encourages the emancipation of slaves. In various verses, the Quran refers to slaves as "necks" (raqabah) or "those whom your right hand possesses" (Ma malakat aymanukum). (Note: For example, Quran 4.3:^{[Quran 4:3]} "If ye fear that ye shall not be able to deal justly with the orphans, Marry women of your choice, Two or three or four; but if ye fear that ye shall not be able to deal justly (with them), then only one, or (a captive) that your right hands possess, that will be more suitable, to prevent you from doing injustice". Quran 16.71:^{[Quran 16:71]} "Allah has bestowed His gifts of sustenance more freely on some of you than on others: those more favoured are not going to throw back their gifts to those whom their right hands possess, so as to be equal in that respect. Will they then deny the favours of Allah?" Quran 23:5:^{[Quran 23:5]} "And who guard their modesty, Quran 23:6: Save from their wives or the (slaves) that their right hands possess, for then they are not blameworthy." Other examples: Quran 4:25, 4:28, 24:33, 24:58, 33:50, etc) In addition to these terms for slaves, the Quran and early Islamic literature uses 'Abd (male) and Amah (female) term for an enslaved and servile possession, as well as other terms. According to Brockopp, seven separate terms for slaves appear in the Quran, in at least twenty nine Quranic verses.

The Quran assigns the same spiritual value to a slave and a free man, and a believing slave is regarded as superior to a free pagan or idolator. The manumission of slaves is regarded as a meritorious act in the Quran, and is recommended either as an act of charity or as expiation for sins. While the spiritual value of a slave was the same as the freeman, states Forough Jahanbakhsh, in regards to earthly matters, a slave was not an equal to the freeman and relegated to an inferior status. In the Quran and for its many commentators, states Ennaji, there is a fundamental distinction between free Muslims and slaves, a basic constituent of its social organization, an irreparable dichotomy introduced by the existence of believers and infidels.

The corpus of the hadiths which are attributed to Muhammad or his Companions contain a large store of reports which enjoin kindness toward slaves. Chouki El Hamel has argued that the Quran recommends gradual abolition of slavery, and that some hadith are consistent with that message while others contradict it. Muhammad forbade torturing slaves and advised their masters to treat them well. He also forbade their masters from referring to them as "slaves" but he allowed their masters to refer to them as "my young man".

According to Dror Ze'evi, early Islamic dogma set out to improve the conditions of human bondage. It forbade the enslavement of free members of Islamic society, including non-Muslims (dhimmis) who lived under Islamic rule. Islam also allowed the acquisition of lawful non-Muslim slaves who were imprisoned, the acquisition of slaves who were purchased in lands which were located outside the Islamic state, as well as the designation of boys or girls who were born to slaves as slaves. Islamic law treats a free man and a slave unequally in sentencing for an equivalent crime. For example, traditional Sunni jurisprudence, with the exception of Hanafi law, objects to putting a free man to death for killing a slave. A slave who commits a crime may receive the same punishment as a free man, a punishment half as severe, or the master may be responsible for paying the damages, depending on the crime. According to Ze'evi, Islam considered the master to be the owner of the slave as well as the beneficiary of the slave's labor, a slave was the property of his or her master and as a result, he or she could be sold or bought at will, and the master was entitled to demand sexual submission from women who were his slave's.

During religious wars or jihads, the Islamic law (the sharia) allows Muslims to take non-Muslims as slaves. In the early Islamic communities, according to Kecia Ali, "both life and law were saturated with slaves and slavery". War, tribute from vassal states, purchase and children who inherited their parent's slavery were the sources of slaves in Islam. In Islam, according to Paul Lovejoy, "the religious requirement that new slaves be pagans and need for continued imports to maintain slave population made Africa an important source of slaves for the Islamic world." Slavery of non-Muslims, followed by the structured process of converting them to Islam then encouraging the freeing of the converted slave, states Lovejoy helped the growth of Islam after its conquests.

According to Mohammed Ennaji, the right to own slaves gave the master the right "to punish one's slave". In Islam, a child inherited slavery if he or she was born to a slave mother and slave father. However, if the child was born to a slave mother and her owner master, then the child was free. Slaves could be given as property (dower) during marriage. The text encourages Muslim men to take slave women as sexual partners (concubines), or marry them. Islam, states Lewis, did not permit Dhimmis (non-Muslims) "to own Muslim slaves; and if a slave owned by a dhimmi embraced Islam, his owner was legally obliged to free or sell him". There was also a gradation in the status on the slave, and his descendants, after the slave converted to Islam.

Under Islamic law, in "what might be called civil matters", a slave was "a chattel with no legal powers or rights whatsoever", states Lewis. A slave could not own or inherit property or enter into a contract. However, he was better off in terms of rights than Greek or Roman slaves. According to Chirag Ali, the early Muslims misinterpreted the Quran as sanctioning "polygamy, arbitrary divorce, slavery, concubinage and religious wars", and he states that the Quranic injunctions are against all this. According to Ron Shaham and other scholars, the various jurisprudence systems on Sharia such as Maliki, Hanafi, Shafi'i, Hanbali and others differ in their interpretation of the Islamic law on slaves.

Slaves were particularly numerous in Muslim armies. Slave armies were deployed by Sultans and Caliphs on various medieval era war fronts across the Islamic Empires, playing an important role in the expansion of Islam in Africa and elsewhere. Slavery of men and women in Islamic states such as the Ottoman Empire, states Ze'evi, continued through the early twentieth century.

In the seventeenth century, Celebes Island, a policy that prohibiting the enslavement of Muslims who were not hereditary slaves was issued by the Sultan of Bone, La Maddaremmeng. According to him, all Muslims are free men. However, it did not liberate the enslaved Muslims who were hereditary slaves. Nonetheless, La Maddaremmeng mandated that these slaves should be treated with the same degree of humaneness that one would treat his or her own family with.

Islamic Puritanism was allegedly the motivation for La Maddaremeng's policy of freeing slaves who were owned by Muslims. Apart from freeing slaves, La Maddaremeng also destroyed Idols and he prohibited traditional and ancestral beliefs that contradicted the teachings of Islam. His puritanical activities were opposed by the people, by the aristocrats, by the neighboring kings, and even by his own mother, We Tenrisoloreng Datu Pattiro. The Invasion of Bone by The Gowa Sultanate led him into his capture and deposition.

== Baháʼí Faith ==
Bahá'u'lláh, founder of the Baháʼí Faith, commended Queen Victoria for abolishing the slave trade in a letter written to Her Majesty between 1868 and 1872. Bahá'u'lláh also forbids slavery in the Kitáb-i-Aqdas written around 1873 considered by Baháʼís to be the holiest book revealed by Bahá'u'lláh in which he states, "It is forbidden you to trade in slaves, be they men or women."

Both the Báb and Bahá'u'lláh owned slaves of African descent before the writing of the Kitab-i-Aqdas. While the Báb purchased several slaves, Bahá'u'lláh acquired his through inheritance and freed them. Bahá'u'lláh officially condemned slavery in 1874. Twenty-first century scholarship has found that the Báb credited one of the slaves of his elders as having raised him and compares him favorably with his own father. Work has continued on other recent finds in archives such as a very early document of Bahá'u'lláh's explaining his emancipating his slave because as all humans are symbolically slaves of God none can be owned by another saying "How, then, can this thrall claim for himself ownership of any other human being? Nay,...."

== Hinduism ==
=== Vedic period ===
The term "dasa" (dāsa) in the Vedas is loosely translated as "slave." However, the meaning of the term varied over time. R. S. Sharma, in his 1958 book, for example, states that the only word which could possibly mean slave in Rigveda is dāsa, and this sense of use is traceable to four later verses in Rigveda. The term dāsa in the Rigveda, has been also been translated as a servant or enemy, and the identity of this term remains unclear and disputed among scholars. (Note: [a] H. H. Wilson translates dāsa in Rigvedic instances identified by R. S. Sharma, such as in verse 10.62.10, as servant rather than slave. [b] Michael Witzel suggests that the term dāsa in Sanskrit corresponds to North Iranian tribe; Iranian (Latin) Dahae, (Greek) Daai; and that dāsa word may be memory of Indo-Aryan migration; with George Samuel stating that dāsa may be equivalent for "aborigines, servant or slave".)

R. S. Sharma writes that the word dāsi is found in Rigveda and Atharvaveda, and that it represented "a small servile class of women slaves". Slavery in the Vedic period, according to him, was mostly confined to women employed as domestic workers. He translates dāsi in a Vedic era Upanishads as "maid-servant". Male slaves are rarely mentioned in the Vedic texts. The word dāsa occurs in the Hindu Śruti texts Aitareya and Gopatha Brahmana, but not in the sense of a slave.

=== Classical Hinduism ===
Towards the end of the Vedic period (600 BCE), a new system of varnas had appeared, with people called shudras replacing the erstwhile dasas. Some of the shudras were employed as labouring masses on farm land, much like "helots of Sparta", even though they were not treated with the same degree of coercion and contempt. The term dasa was now employed to designate such enslaved people. Slavery arose out of debt, sale by parents or oneself (due to famines), judicial decree or fear. While this could happen to a person of any varna, shudras were much more likely to be reduced to slavery.

The Smriti contain classifications of slaves, and the slaves were differentiated by origin and different disabilities and rules for manumission applied.

Hindu Smritis are critical of slavery. Slaves could be given away as gifts along with the land, which came in for criticism from the religious texts Āśvalāyana and Kātyāyana Srautasūtra. According to many Dharmasastras, release from slavery is an act of piety. Slavery was considered as a sign of backwardness by the Arthashastra author Kauṭilya, who provided slaves the right to property and abolished hereditary slavery, prohibited the sale and pledge of children as slaves. The Arthashastra laid down norms for the state to resettle shudra cultivators into new villages and providing them with land, grain, cattle and money. It also stated that aryas could not be subject to slavery and that the selling or mortgaging of a shudra was punishable unless he was a born slave.

The Agni Purana forbids enslavement of prisoners. The Apastamba Dharmasutra discusses the emancipation of slaves.

Bhakti movements from the early centuries of common era, encouraged personal devotion to one divine being. They welcomed members from all backgrounds, and thus criticizing slavery by implication.

=== British Raj ===
In the territories controlled by the East India Company, in South Asia, an adaptation of a Dharmaśāstra named Manusmriti, and specifically an interpretation of verse 8.415 of the Manusmriti, was used to regulate the practice in Hindu communities, via what became known as the Hindu law.

== Buddhism ==
Slavery existed in ancient India and, according to Scott Levi, it was likely an established institution that was "widespread by the lifetime of the Buddha and perhaps even as far back as the Vedic period." The topic of slavery and mention of slaves, therefore, can be found in Buddhist history and texts. From a Buddhist perspective, according to Gautama Buddha, the founder of Buddhism, the laity and monastics of his following were advised to not partake in the slave trade:

These five trades, O monks, should not be taken up by a lay follower: trading with weapons, trading in living beings, trading in meat, trading in intoxicants, trading in poison.

— Anguttara Nikaya V.177, Translated by Martine Batchelor

In Pali language Buddhist texts, Amaya-dasa has been translated by Davids and Stede in 1925, as a "slave by birth", Kila-dasa translated as a "bought slave", and Amata-dasa as "one who sees Amata (Sanskrit: Amrita, nectar of immortality) or Nibbana". However, dasa in ancient texts can also mean "servant". Words related to dasa are found in early Buddhist texts, such as dāso na pabbājetabbo, which Davids and Stede translate as "the slave cannot become a Bhikkhu". This restriction on who could become a Buddhist monk is found in Vinaya Pitakam i.93, Digha Nikaya, Majjhima Nikāya, Tibetan Bhiksukarmavakya and Upasampadajnapti. Schopen states that this translation of dasa as slave is disputed by scholars.

The term dāsa and dāsyu in Vedic and other ancient Indian literature has been interpreted by as "servant" or "slave", but others have contested such meaning. The term dāsa in the Rigveda, has been also been translated as an enemy, but overall the identity of this term remains unclear and disputed among scholars.

Early Buddhist texts in Pali, according to R. S. Sharma, mention dāsa and kammakaras, and they show that those who failed to pay their debts were enslaved, and Buddhism did not allow debtors and slaves to join their monasteries.

The 3rd century BCE Edicts of Ashoka identify obligations to slaves (Greek: δούλοις) and hired workers (Greek: μισθωτοῖς), and later prohibited the trading of slaves within the Maurya Empire.

Medieval Buddhist states codified slavery, combining local customary practices with derivatives of the Vedic Manusmriti. The series of dhammathats (legal treatises) for states covering Burma and North West India observed the 14 kinds of slavery set out in the Wareru Dhammathat, while Slavery in Bhutan was regulated into the mid-twentieth century by a local derivation of the Tibetan Buddhism Tsa Yig Chenmo.

== Sikhism ==
Guru Nanak, first Guru of Sikhs, preached against slavery. He not only advocated human equality, by rejecting class inequalities and caste hierarchy, but also practically promoted it through the institution of Pangat and Sangat. Baba Farid also protested against slavery.

== See also ==
- Catholic Church and slavery
- History of slavery
