= In supremo apostolatus =

1839 papal bull by Pope Gregory XVI

In supremo apostolatus Latin for 'To the supreme apostolate' Encyclical of Pope Gregory XVI
- Signature date: 3 December 1839
- Subject: On slavery
- Text: In original language

In supremo apostolatus is a papal brief issued by Pope Gregory XVI regarding the institution of slavery. Issued on 3 December 1839, as a result of a broad consultation among the College of Cardinals, the bull resoundingly denounces both the slave trade and the continuance of the institution of slavery.

== Content ==
The Bull outlines the history of Church attitudes to slavery, beginning with the Apostles who tolerated slavery but called on masters to "act well towards their slaves [...] knowing that the common Master both of themselves and of the slaves is in Heaven, and that with Him there is no distinction of persons". The Bull then discusses the involvement of Christians for and against slavery:

In the process of time, the fog of pagan superstition being more completely dissipated and the manners of barbarous people having been softened, thanks to Faith operating by Charity, it at last comes about that, since several centuries, there are no more slaves in the greater number of Christian nations. But - We say with profound sorrow - there were to be found afterwards among the Faithful men who, shamefully blinded by the desire of sordid gain, in lonely and distant countries, did not hesitate to reduce to slavery Indians, negroes and other wretched peoples, or else, by instituting or developing the trade in those who had been made slaves by others, to favour their unworthy practice. Certainly many Roman Pontiffs of glorious memory, Our Predecessors, did not fail, according to the duties of their charge, to blame severely this way of acting as dangerous for the spiritual welfare of those engaged in the traffic and a shame to the Christian name; they foresaw that as a result of this, the infidel peoples would be more and more strengthened in their hatred of the true Religion.

The Bull refers to several earlier papal pronouncements seeking to alleviate the suffering of slaves, beginning with the bull Sublimis Deus of Pope Paul III, given on 29 May 1537, to the Cardinal Archbishop of Toledo, and that of Pope Urban VIII on 22 April 1639 to the Collector Jurium of the Apostolic Chamber of Portugal; then that of Pope Benedict XIV of 20 December 1741, to the Bishops of Brazil and some other regions; then another by Pope Pius II, of 7 October 1462 and finally (not referring to any specific occasion) Pope Pius VII. Pope Gregory then condemns the continuing slave trade:

[W]e have judged that it belonged to Our pastoral solicitude to exert Ourselves to turn away the Faithful from the inhuman slave trade in Negroes and all other men. [...] [D]esiring to remove such a shame from all the Christian nations, having fully reflected over the whole question and having taken the advice of many of Our Venerable Brothers the Cardinals of the Holy Roman Church, and walking in the footsteps of Our Predecessors, We warn and adjure earnestly in the Lord faithful Christians of every condition that no one in the future dare to vex anyone, despoil him of his possessions, reduce to servitude, or lend aid and favour to those who give themselves up to these practices, or exercise that inhuman traffic by which the Blacks, as if they were not men but rather animals, having been brought into servitude, in no matter what way, are, without any distinction, in contempt of the rights of justice and humanity, bought, sold, and devoted sometimes to the hardest labour. Further, in the hope of gain, propositions of purchase being made to the first owners of the Blacks, dissensions and almost perpetual conflicts are aroused in these regions.
We reprove, then, by virtue of Our Apostolic Authority, all the practices abovementioned as absolutely unworthy of the Christian name. By the same Authority We prohibit and strictly forbid any Ecclesiastic or lay person from presuming to defend as permissible this traffic in Blacks under no matter what pretext or excuse, or from publishing or teaching in any manner whatsoever, in public or privately, opinions contrary to what We have set forth in this Apostolic Letter.

== Effects in the United States ==
The Bull had political consequences for the Catholic communities in slaveholding states, especially Maryland. The bishop of Charleston, John England, despite privately abhorring slavery, interpreted In supremo apostolatus in his ecclesiastical province as a condemnation of large-scale slave-trading, as opposed to the individual owning of slaves even though it forbade defending the institution of slavery "under any pretext...or excuse".

In 1852, American bishops convened upon Baltimore for the First Plenary Council of Baltimore, and remarks on the conditions of slaves were kept to the need for prayers for individuals in slavery. The Irish-born archbishop of Baltimore, Francis Kenrick, raised the issue of the condition of slaves in America but concluded that "such is the state of things, [that] nothing should be attempted against the laws".

== Two translations ==
Latin	1844 Translation	1972 Translation
Quare Nos, tantum hujusmodi probrum a cunctis christianorum finibus avertere cupientes, ac re universa nonnullis etiam venerabilibus Fratribus Nostris S. R. E. Cardinalibus in consilium adhibitis,	Wherefore WE, desiring to turn away so great a reproach as this from all the boundaries of Christians, and the whole matter being maturely weighed, certain cardinals of the holy Roman Church, our venerable brethren being also called into council,	This is why, desiring to remove such a shame from all the Christian nations, having fully reflected over the whole question and having taken the advice of many of Our Venerable Brothers the Cardinals of the Holy Roman Church,
mature perpensa, Praedecessorum Nostrorum insistentes vestigiis, auctoritate Apostolica,	treading in the footsteps of our predecessors, with apostolic authority,	and walking in the footsteps of Our Predecessors,
omnes cujuscumque conditionis Christi fideles admonemus etobtestamur in Domino vehementer,	do vehemently admonish and adjure in the Lord all believers in Christ, of whatsoever condition,	We warn and adjure earnestly in the Lord faithful Christians of every condition
ne quis audeat in posterum Indos, Nigritas, seu alios hujusmodi homines injuste vexare,	that no one hereafter may dare unjustly to molest Indians, negroes, or other men of this sort;	that no one in the future dare to vex anyone,
aut spoliare suis bonis,	or to spoil them of their goods;	despoil him of his possessions,
aut in servitutem redigere,	or to reduce them to slavery;	reduce to servitude,
vel aliis talia in eos patrantibus auxilium aut favorem praestare,	or to extend help or favour to others who perpetrate such things against them;	or lend aid and favour to those who give themselves up to these practices,
seu exercere inhumanum illud commercium, quo Nigritae, tanquam si non homines, sed pura, putaque animantia forent,	or to exercise that inhuman trade by which negroes, as if they were not men, but mere animals,	or exercise that inhuman traffic by which the Blacks, as if they were not men but rather animals,
in servitutem utcumque redacti, sine ullo discrimine contra justitiae et humanitatis jura emuntur, venduntur, ac durissimis interdum laboribus exantlandis devoventur,	howsoever reduced into slavery, are, without any distinction, contrary to the laws of justice and humanity, bought, sold, and doomed sometimes to the most severe and exhausting labours;	having been brought into servitude, in no matter what way, are, without any distinction, in contempt of the rights of justice and humanity, bought, sold, and devoted sometimes to the hardest labour.

== See also ==
- Catholic Church and slavery
- Christian abolitionism
