= Synod of Gangra =

Christian Synod (340)

The Synod of Gangra was a council of the Christian church held in the fourth century, at Gangra in Paphlagonia (Çankırı, modern Turkey). The exact date is contested, but is generally agreed to be the year 340.

The synod was arranged with 14 bishops and led by Eusebius of Nicomedia.

The synod condemned Manichaeans, and their practices. The concluding canons of the synod condemned the Manichaeans for their actions, and declared many of their practices anathematised. The synod also spoke against the beliefs and actions of Eustathius of Sebaste.

The canons of the synod condemned and anathematised the practices of:

- the condemnation of marriage
- forbidding the eating of most forms of meat
- urging slaves to flee their masters
- arguing that married priests could not perform valid sacraments
- condemning normal church services and holding their own
- distributing church revenues without the consent of the bishop
- remaining celibate for reasons other than holiness
- reviling married persons and the celebration of Christian love-feasts
- wearing certain types of ascetic clothing "as if this gave him righteousness" and condemning others
- women wearing men's clothing under the pretense of asceticism
- women leaving their husbands
- parents abandoning their children
- children leaving their parents
- women cutting off their hair "from pretended asceticism"
- fasting on a Sunday under the pretense of asceticism
- refusing to honour Christian martyrs
