= Pope Nicholas V =

Head of Catholic Church from 1447 to 1455

- Bishop of Rome
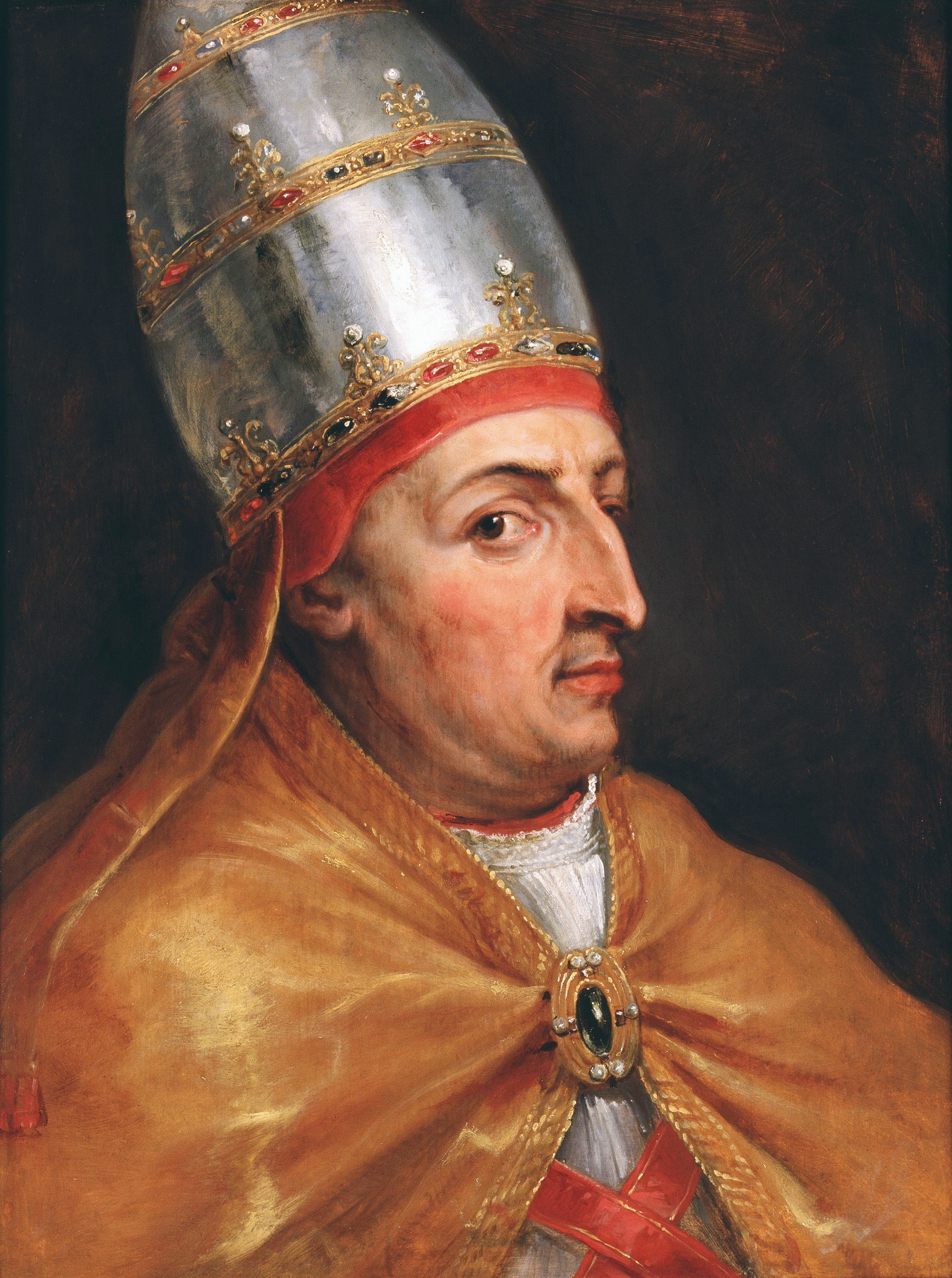
- Portrait of Pope Nicholas V, by Peter Paul Rubens, c. 1612–1616
- Church: Catholic Church
- Papacy began: 6 March 1447
- Papacy ended: 24 March 1455
- Predecessor: Eugene IV
- Successor: Callixtus III
- Previous posts: Bishop of Bologna (1444–1447); Cardinal-Priest of Santa Susanna (1446–1447)

Orders
- Ordination: 1422 by Niccolò Albergati
- Consecration: 17 March 1447 by Francesco Condulmer
- Created cardinal: 16 December 1446 by Eugene IV

Personal details
- Born: Tommaso Parentucelli; 15 November 1397 Sarzana, Republic of Genoa
- Died: 24 March 1455 (aged 57) Rome, Papal States
- Coat of arms

Papal styles of Pope Nicholas V
- Reference style: His Holiness
- Spoken style: Your Holiness
- Religious style: Holy Father
- Posthumous style: None

Pope Nicholas V (Latin: Nicolaus V; Italian: Niccolò V; 15 November 1397 – 24 March 1455), born Tommaso Parentucelli, was head of the Catholic Church and ruler of the Papal States from 6 March 1447 until his death in March 1455. Pope Eugene IV made him a cardinal in 1446 after successful trips to Italy and Germany, and when Eugene died the next year, Parentucelli was elected in his place. He took his name Nicholas in memory of his obligations to Niccolò Albergati. He remains the most recent pope to take the pontifical name "Nicholas".

The pontificate of Nicholas saw the fall of Constantinople to the Ottoman Turks and the end of the Hundred Years' War. He responded by calling a crusade against the Ottomans, which never materialized. By the Concordat of Vienna he secured the recognition of papal rights over bishoprics and benefices. He also brought about the submission of the last of the antipopes, Felix V, and the dissolution of the Synod of Basel. A key figure in the Roman Renaissance, Nicholas sought to make Rome the home of literature and art. He strengthened fortifications, restored aqueducts, and rebuilt many churches. He ordered design plans for what would eventually be the Basilica of St. Peter.

== Early life ==
Tommaso Parentucelli was born in Sarzana, an important town in Lunigiana, to the physician Bartolomeo Parentucelli and wife Andreola Bosi of Fivizzano. The Lunigiana region had long been fought over by competing Tuscan, Ligurian and Milanese forces. Three years before Parentucelli's birth, the town was captured from the Florentines by the Genoese Republic. His father died while he was young. Parentucelli later became a tutor, in Florence, to the families of the Strozzi and Albizzi, where he met the leading Renaissance humanist scholars.

Parentucelli studied at Bologna and Florence, gaining a degree in theology, in 1422. Bishop Niccolò Albergati was so awestruck with his capabilities that he took him into his service and gave him the chance to pursue his studies further by sending him on a tour through Germany, France and England. He was able to collect books, for which he had an intellectual's passion, wherever he went. Some of them survive with his marginal annotations.

Parentucelli attended the Council of Florence. In 1444, when his patron died, he was appointed Bishop of Bologna in his place. Civic disorders at Bologna were prolonged, so Pope Eugene IV soon named him as one of the legates sent to Frankfurt. He was to assist in negotiating an understanding between the Papal States and the Holy Roman Empire, regarding undercutting or at least containing the reforming decrees of the Council of Basel (1431–1439).

== Papacy ==
Parentucelli's successful diplomacy gained him the reward, on his return to Rome, of the title Cardinal-Priest of Santa Susanna in December 1446. At the papal conclave of 1447 he was elected pope in succession to Eugene IV on 6 March. He took the name Nicholas in honour of his early benefactor, Niccolò Albergati.

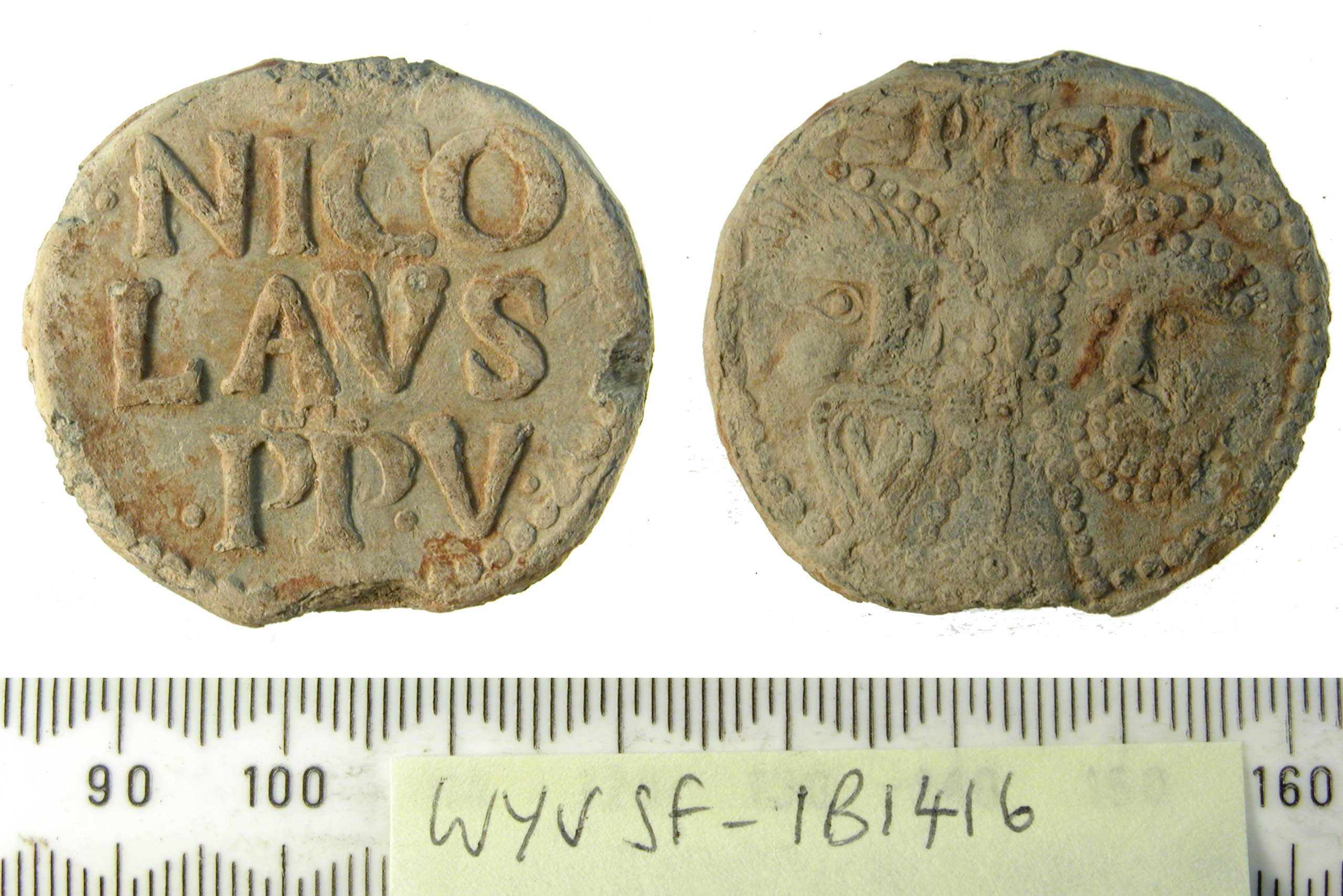
Papal bulla of Nicholas V

In only eight years, his pontificate delivered important achievements in the political, scientific, and literary history of the world. Politically, he needed to repair relationships which had broken down in the pontificate of Eugene IV. He called the congress which produced the Treaty of Lodi, secured peace with Charles VII of France, and concluded the Concordat of Vienna or Aschaffenburg (17 February 1448) with the German King, Frederick III, by which the decrees of the Council of Basel against papal annates and reservations were abrogated so far as Germany was concerned. In the following year he secured a still greater tactical triumph with the resignation of the Antipope Felix V on 7 April and his own recognition by the rump of the Council of Basel that assembled at Lausanne.

In 1450, Nicholas held a Jubilee at Rome, and the offerings of the numerous pilgrims who thronged to Rome gave him the means of furthering the cause of culture in Italy, which he had so much at heart. In March 1452 he crowned Frederick III as Holy Roman Emperor in St. Peter's, in what was the last imperial coronation held in Rome.

Within the city of Rome, Nicholas introduced the fresh spirit of the Renaissance both intellectually and architecturally. His plans were of embellishing the city with new monuments worthy of the capital of the Christian world. It was in recognition of this commitment to building that Leon Battista Alberti dedicated to Nicholas V his treatise De re aedificatoria.

He is the last pope to date to take the pontifical name "Nicholas".

=== Rebuilding Rome ===
His first care was practical, to reinforce the city's fortifications, cleaning and even paving some main streets and restoring the water supply. The end of ancient Rome is sometimes dated from the destruction of its magnificent array of aqueducts by 6th-century invaders. In the Middle Ages Romans depended on wells and cisterns for water, and the poor dipped their water from the yellow Tiber. The Aqua Virgo aqueduct, originally constructed by Agrippa, was restored by Nicholas and emptied into a simple basin that Alberti designed, the predecessor of the Trevi Fountain.

He continued restoration of the major Roman basilicas, but also of many other Roman churches including Sant' Apostoli, Sant' Eusebio, San Lorenzo fuori le Mura, Santa Maria in Trastevere, Santa Prassede, San Salvatore, Santo Stefano Rotondo, San Teodoro, and especially San Celso. He rebuilt the Ponte Sant' Angelo which had collapsed in 1450, and supported the redevelopment of the surrounding area as a prestigious business and residential district.

=== Arts patron ===
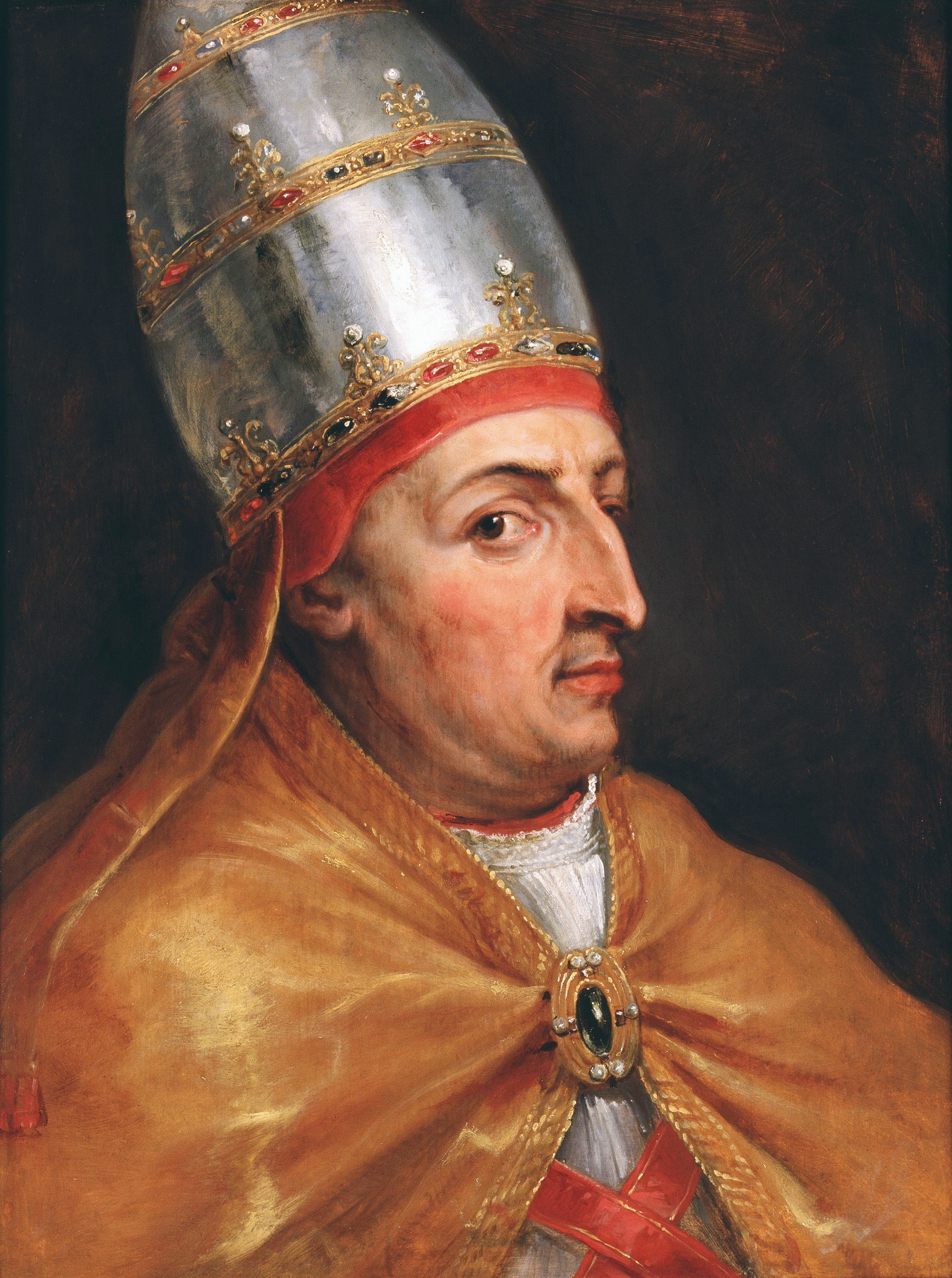
Posthumous portrait of Nicholas V, by Peter Paul Rubens, 1612

Nicholas V's major focus was on establishing the Vatican as the official residence of the Papacy, replacing the Lateran Palace. He added a substantial new wing including a private chapel to the Vatican, and – according to Giannozzo Manetti, biographer of Nicholas – planned substantial changes to the Borgo district. He also laid up 2,522 cartloads of marble from the dilapidated Colosseum for use in the later constructions.

The Pope's contemporaries criticised his lavish expenditure on building: Manetti drew parallels with the wealth and expenditure of Solomon, suggesting that Papal wealth was acceptable so long as it was expended to the glory of God and the good of the Church. The decoration of the Niccoline Chapel by Fra Angelico demonstrated this message through its depictions of St Lawrence (martyred for refusing to hand to the Roman state the wealth of the Church) and St Stephen.

Under the generous patronage of Nicholas, Renaissance humanism made rapid strides as well. The new humanist learning had been hitherto looked on with suspicion in Rome, a possible source of schism and heresy from an unhealthy interest in paganism. For Nicholas, humanism became a tool for the cultural aggrandizement of the Christian capital, and he sent emissaries to the East to attract Greek scholars after the fall of Constantinople. The pope also employed Lorenzo Valla to translate Greek histories, pagan as well as Christian, into Latin. This industry, coming just before the dawn of printing, contributed enormously to the sudden expansion of the intellectual horizon.

Nicholas, with assistance from Enoch of Ascoli and Giovanni Tortelli, founded a library of five thousand volumes, including manuscripts rescued from the Turks after the fall of Constantinople. The Pope himself was a man of vast erudition, and his friend Aeneas Silvius Piccolomini, later Pope Pius II, said of him that "what he does not know is outside the range of human knowledge". A lifelong bibliophile, he treasured books: while the Vatican library was still being designed and planned, he kept the rarest books near to him in his bedroom, with the others in a room nearby. Often thinking fondly of his former work as a librarian, he once remarked, "I had more happiness in a day than now in a whole year."

He was compelled, however, to add that the lustre of his pontificate would be forever dulled by the fall of Constantinople, which the Turks took in 1453. Unsuccessful in a campaign to unite Christian powers to come to the aid of Constantinople, just before that great citadel was conquered, Nicholas had ordered 10 papal ships to sail with ships from Genoa, Venice and Naples to defend the capital of the Eastern Roman Empire. However, the ancient capital fell before the ships could offer any aid. The Pope bitterly felt this catastrophe as a double blow to Christendom and to Greek letters. "It is a second death", wrote Aeneas Silvius, "to Homer and Plato."

Nicholas preached a crusade and endeavoured to reconcile the mutual animosities of the Italian states, but without much success.

In undertaking these works, Nicholas was moved "to strengthen the weak faith of the populace by the greatness of that which it sees". The Roman populace, however, appreciated neither his motives nor their results, and in 1452 a formidable conspiracy for the overthrow of the papal government under the leadership of Stefano Porcari was discovered and crushed. This revelation of disaffection, together with the fall of Constantinople in 1453, darkened the last years of Pope Nicholas. "As Thomas of Sarzana", he said, "I had more happiness in a day than now in a whole year".

=== Slavery ===
In late spring of 1452 Byzantine Emperor Constantine XI wrote to Pope Nicholas for help against the impending siege by Ottoman Sultan Mehmed II. Nicholas issued the bull Dum Diversas (18 June 1452) authorizing King Afonso V of Portugal to "attack, conquer, and subjugate Saracens, pagans and other enemies of Christ wherever they may be found". Issued less than a year before the fall of Constantinople, the bull may have been intended to begin another crusade against the Ottoman Empire.

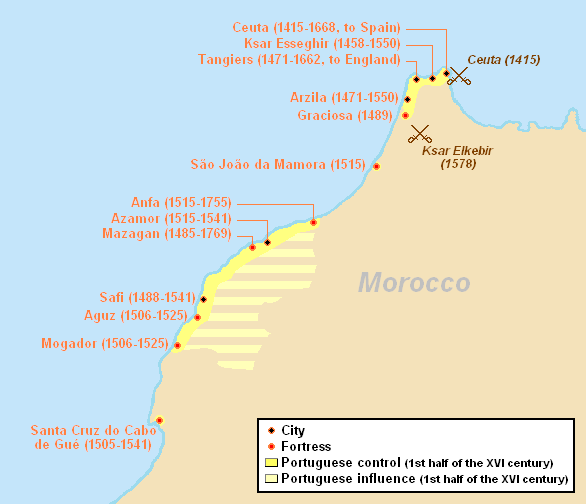
Portuguese possessions in Morocco (1415–1769)

Before the Treaty of Alcáçovas of 1479 and the Treaty of Tordesillas of 1494, ownership of the Canary Islands continued to be a source of dispute between Spain and Portugal, and Nicholas was asked to settle the matter, ultimately in favor of the Portuguese. The geographical area of the concession given in the bull is not explicit, but historian Richard Raiswell finds that it clearly refers to the recently discovered lands along the coast of West Africa. Portuguese ventures were intended to compete with the Muslim trans-Sahara caravans, which played a key role in the highly profitable Muslim slave trade and also held a monopoly on West African gold and ivory.

The Portuguese claimed territorial rights along the African coast by virtue of having invested time and treasure in discovering it; the Castilian claim was based on their being the heirs of the Visigoths. In 1454 a fleet of caravels from Seville and Cádiz traded along the African coast and upon their return, were intercepted by a Portuguese squadron. Enrique IV of Castile threatened war. Afonso V appealed to the Pope for moral support of Portugal's right to a monopoly of trade in lands she discovered.

The papal bull Romanus Pontifex, issued on 8 January 1455, endorsed Portuguese possession of Cuerta (which they already held), and the exclusive right to trade, navigation, and fishing in the discovered lands, and reaffirmed the previous Dum Diversas. It granted permission to Afonso and his heirs to "... make purchases and sales of any things and goods, and victuals whatsoever, as it may seem fit, with any Saracens and infidels in said regions; ... provided they be not iron instruments, wood used for construction, cordage, ships, and any kinds of armor."

The bull conferred exclusive trading rights to the Portuguese between Morocco and the Indies with the rights to conquer and convert the inhabitants. A significant concession given by Nicholas in a brief issued to King Alfonso in 1454 extended the rights granted to existing territories to all those that might be taken in the future. Consistent with these broad aims, it allowed the Portuguese "to invade, search out, capture, vanquish, and subdue all Saracens and pagans whatsoever, and other enemies of Christ wheresoever placed, and the kingdoms, dukedoms, principalities, dominions, possessions, and all movable and immovable goods whatsoever held and possessed by them and to reduce their persons to perpetual slavery". However, together with a second reference to some who have already been enslaved, this has been used to suggest that Nicholas sanctioned the purchase of black slaves from "the infidel": "... many Guineamen and other negroes, taken by force, and some by barter of unprohibited articles, or by other lawful contract of purchase, have been ... converted to the Catholic faith, and it is hoped, by the help of divine mercy, that if such progress be continued with them, either those peoples will be converted to the faith or at least the souls of many of them will be gained for Christ."

It is on this basis that it has been argued that collectively the two bulls issued by Nicholas gave the Portuguese the rights to acquire slaves along the African coast by force or trade. By dealing with local African chieftains and Muslim slave traders, the Portuguese sought to become key European players in the lucrative slave trade. The concessions given were confirmed by bulls issued by Pope Callixtus III ( Inter Caetera quae in 1456), which recognized Portugal's trade rights in territories it had discovered along the West African coast. This confirmation of Romanus Pontifex also gave the Portuguese the military Order of Christ under Henry the Navigator. Other papal bulls would go on later to confirm territorial possessions and acquisitions of Spanish and Portugal such as Sixtus IV (Aeterni regis in 1481), Pope Alexander VI: Eximiae devotionis (3 May 1493), Inter Caetera (4 May 1493) and Dudum siquidem (23 September 1493).

== See also ==
- Cardinals created by Nicholas V
- Ludwig von Pastor
- Sicut Dudum

Catholic Church titles
Preceded by Eugene IV	Pope; 6 March 1447 – 24 March 1455	Succeeded by Callixtus III
