= Bulls of Donation =

1493 papal bulls granting territories to Spain and Portugal

The Spanish (red) and Portuguese (blue) empires about 1600, not showing the unsettled areas claimed by Spain

The Bulls of Donation, also called the Alexandrine Bulls, and the Papal donations of 1493, are three papal bulls of Pope Alexander VI delivered in 1493 which granted overseas territories to Portugal and the Catholic Monarchs of Spain.

A fourth bull followed later the same year, and all four bulls were replaced by the Treaty of Tordesillas of 1494.

== Description ==
The Pope issued edicts dated 3 and 4 May 1493. The third superseded the first two. A final edict, Dudum siquidem of 26 September 1493, supplemented the Inter caetera.

- The first bull, Inter caetera, dated 3 May, recognized Spain's claim to any discovered lands not already held by a Christian prince, and protected Portugal's previous rights. Both parties found this too vague.
- The second bull, Eximiae devotionis, also dated 3 May, granted to the kings of Castile and León and their successors the same privileges in the newly discovered land that had been granted to the kings of Portugal in the regions of Africa, and Guinea.
- The third bull, also entitled Inter Caetera, dated 4 May, exhorts the Spanish monarchs to spread the faith west from a line drawn "... one hundred leagues towards the west and south from any of the islands commonly known as the Azores and Cape Verde". Diffie notes that it has been suggested that this change may have been prompted by the Portuguese ambassador.

Dudum siquidem of 26 September 1493 addressed to the Catholic Monarchs Isabella I of Castile and Ferdinand II of Aragon which supplemented the bull Inter caetera and granted to them "all islands and mainlands whatsoever, found and to be found, discovered and to be discovered, that are or may be or may seem to be in the route of navigation or travel towards the west or south, whether they be in western parts, or in the regions of the south and east and of India".

The bulls were the basis for negotiation between the two powers which resulted in the Treaty of Tordesillas of 1494 (ratified by Pope Julius II), dividing the non-Christian world beyond Europe between them. At first these arrangements were respected by most other European powers, but as the Protestant Reformation proceeded the states of Northern Europe came to consider them as a private arrangement between Spain and Portugal.

== See also ==
- Catholic Church and the Age of Discovery
- History of the west coast of North America
- Portuguese colonization of the Americas
- Portuguese Empire
- Spanish Empire
