= Tortelli (surname) =

Tortelli is an Italian surname. Notable people with this name include the following:

- Giovanni Tortelli (c.1400–1466), Italian humanist, theologian and librarian
- Giuseppe Tortelli (1662–1738), Italian painter
- Cícero Tortelli (born 1967), Brazilian swimmer
- Sébastien Tortelli (born 1978), French motorcycle racer
- Alice Tortelli (born 1998), Italian footballer
- Carla Tortelli, fictional character in the American television sitcom Cheers
