= Eximiae devotionis =

1493 papal bull concerning Spanish imperialism

Eximiae devotionis declared on 3 May 1493 is one of three papal bulls delivered by Pope Alexander VI granting any and all overseas territories in the west and ocean to kings of Castile and León that were found by the kings of Castile and León provided those territories were not already in the possession of another Christian lord. The document in addition to Inter caetera delivered on 4 May 1493 and Dudum siquidem delivered on 26 September 1493 make up what is known as the Bulls of Donation.

Eximiae devotionis recognized the claims of the kings of Castile and León and their successors to any discovered lands not already held by a Christian prince, similar to previous recognition granted to the Kings of Portugal regarding trading rights in the regions of Africa and Guinea.
