= Inter caetera =

1493 papal bull issued by Pope Alexander VI

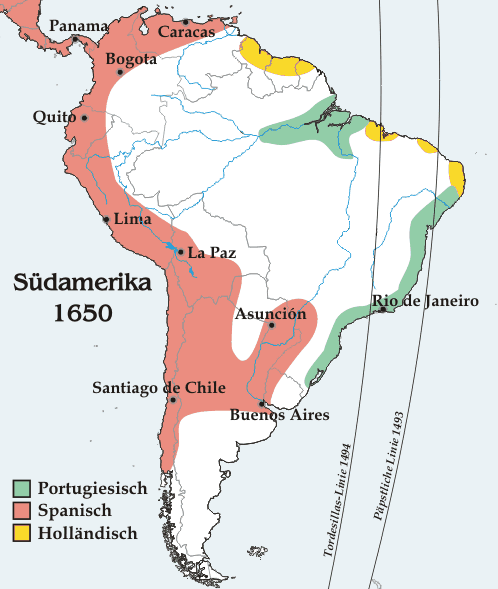
Map of South America; the meridian to the right was defined by Inter caetera (1493), the one to the left by the Treaty of Tordesillas (1494). Modern boundaries and cities are shown for purposes of illustration.

Inter caetera ('Among other [works]') was a papal bull issued by Pope Alexander VI on 4 May 1493, which granted to the Catholic Monarchs King Ferdinand II of Aragon and Queen Isabella I of Castile all lands to the "west and south" of a pole-to-pole line 100 leagues west and south of any of the islands of the Azores or the Cape Verde islands.

It remains unclear whether the pope intended a "donation" of sovereignty or an infeudation or investiture. Differing interpretations have been argued since the bull was issued, with some arguing that it was only meant to transform the possession and occupation of land into lawful sovereignty. Others, including the Spanish crown and the conquistadors, interpreted it in the widest possible sense, deducing that it gave Spain full political sovereignty.

Inter caetera and its supplement Dudum siquidem (September 1493) are two of the Bulls of Donation. While these bulls purported to settle disputes between Spain and Portugal, they did not address the exploratory and colonial ambitions of other nations, which became more of an issue after the Protestant Reformation.

== Background ==
Before Christopher Columbus received support for his voyage from Queen Isabella and King Ferdinand of Spain, he had first approached King John II of Portugal. The king's scholars and navigators reviewed Columbus's documentation, determined that his calculations grossly underestimated the diameter of the Earth and thus the length of the voyage, and recommended against subsidizing the expedition. Upon Columbus's return from his first voyage to the Americas, his first landing was made in the Portuguese Azores; a subsequent storm drove his ship to Lisbon on 4 March 1493. Hearing of Columbus's discoveries, the Portuguese king informed him that he believed the voyage to be in violation of the 1479 Treaty of Alcáçovas. The treaty had been ratified with the 1481 papal bull Aeterni regis, which confirmed previous bulls of 1452 (Dum diversas), 1455 (Romanus Pontifex), and 1456 (Inter caetera), recognizing Portuguese territorial claims along the West African coast. It was the King's understanding that the terms of the treaty acknowledged Portuguese claims to all territory south of the Canary Islands (which had been ceded to Spain).

Columbus's arrival in supposedly Asiatic lands in the western Atlantic Ocean in 1492 threatened the unstable relations between Portugal and Spain. With word that King John was preparing a fleet to sail to the west, the King and Queen of Spain initiated diplomatic discussions over the rights to possess and govern the newly found lands. Spanish and Portuguese delegates met and debated from April to November 1493, without reaching an agreement.

Columbus was still in Lisbon when he sent a report of his success to the Spanish monarchs. On 11 April, the Spanish ambassador conveyed the news to Pope Alexander VI, a Spaniard and the former Administrator of Valencia, and urged him to issue a new bull favorable to Spain. At the time, Pope Alexander, as ruler of the Papal States, was embroiled in a territorial dispute with Ferdinand's first cousin, Ferdinand I, King of Naples, hence he was amicable to any requests of Isabella and Ferdinand, to the extent that they could write to Columbus saying that if he thought it necessary, one of the bulls would be modified. They were at Barcelona, in close touch with Rome. The camera apostolica became almost an extension of the Spanish Court, which secured a rapid succession of bulls virtually liquidating Portuguese claims. The Pope issued edicts dated 3 and 4 May 1493. The third superseded the first two. A final edict, Dudum siquidem of 26 September 1493, supplemented the Inter caetera.

- The first bull, Inter caetera, dated 3 May, recognized Spain's claim to any discovered lands not already held by a Christian prince, and protected Portugal's previous rights. Both parties found this too vague.
- The second bull, Eximiae devotionis, also dated 3 May, granted to the kings of Castile and León and their successors the same privileges in the newly discovered land that had been granted to the kings of Portugal in the regions of Africa, and Guinea.
- The third bull, also entitled Inter caetera, dated 4 May, exhorts the Spanish monarchs to spread the faith west from a line drawn "one hundred leagues towards the west and south from any of the islands commonly known as the Azores and Cape Verde". Diffie notes that it has been suggested that this change may have been prompted by the Portuguese ambassador.

The Inter caetera and the following Treaty of Tordesillas defined and delineated a zone of Spanish rights exclusive of Portugal. In relation to other states the agreement was legally ineffective (res inter alios acta). Spain's attempts to persuade other European powers on the legal validity of the Inter caetera were never successful.

== Provisions ==
Inter caetera states:

Among other works well pleasing to the Divine Majesty and cherished of our heart, this assuredly ranks highest, that in our times especially the Catholic faith and the Christian religion be exalted and be everywhere increased and spread, that the health of souls be cared for and that barbarous nations be overthrown and brought to the faith itself. ...[W]e ... assign to you and your heirs and successors, kings of Castile and Leon, ... all islands and mainlands found and to be found, discovered and to be discovered towards the west and south, by drawing and establishing a line from ... the north, ...to ...the south, ... the said line to be distant one hundred leagues towards the west and south from any of the islands commonly known as the Azores and Cape Verde.

The bull notes that the Isabella and Ferdinand "had intended to seek out and discover certain islands and mainlands remote and unknown" but had been otherwise engaged in the conquest of Granada.

The line of demarcation divided Atlantic zones only. Spain and Portugal could pass each other toward the west or east, respectively, on the other side of the globe and still possess whatever lands they were first to discover. The bull was silent regarding whether lands to the east of the line would belong to Portugal, which had only recently reached the southern tip of Africa (1488) and had not yet reached India (1498). These lands yet "to be discovered" lay beyond those along the west coast of Africa as far as Guinea, and were given to Portugal via the 1481 bull Aeterni regis, which had ratified the Treaty of Alcáçovas. For the time being, the question was in abeyance.

== Effects and aftermath ==
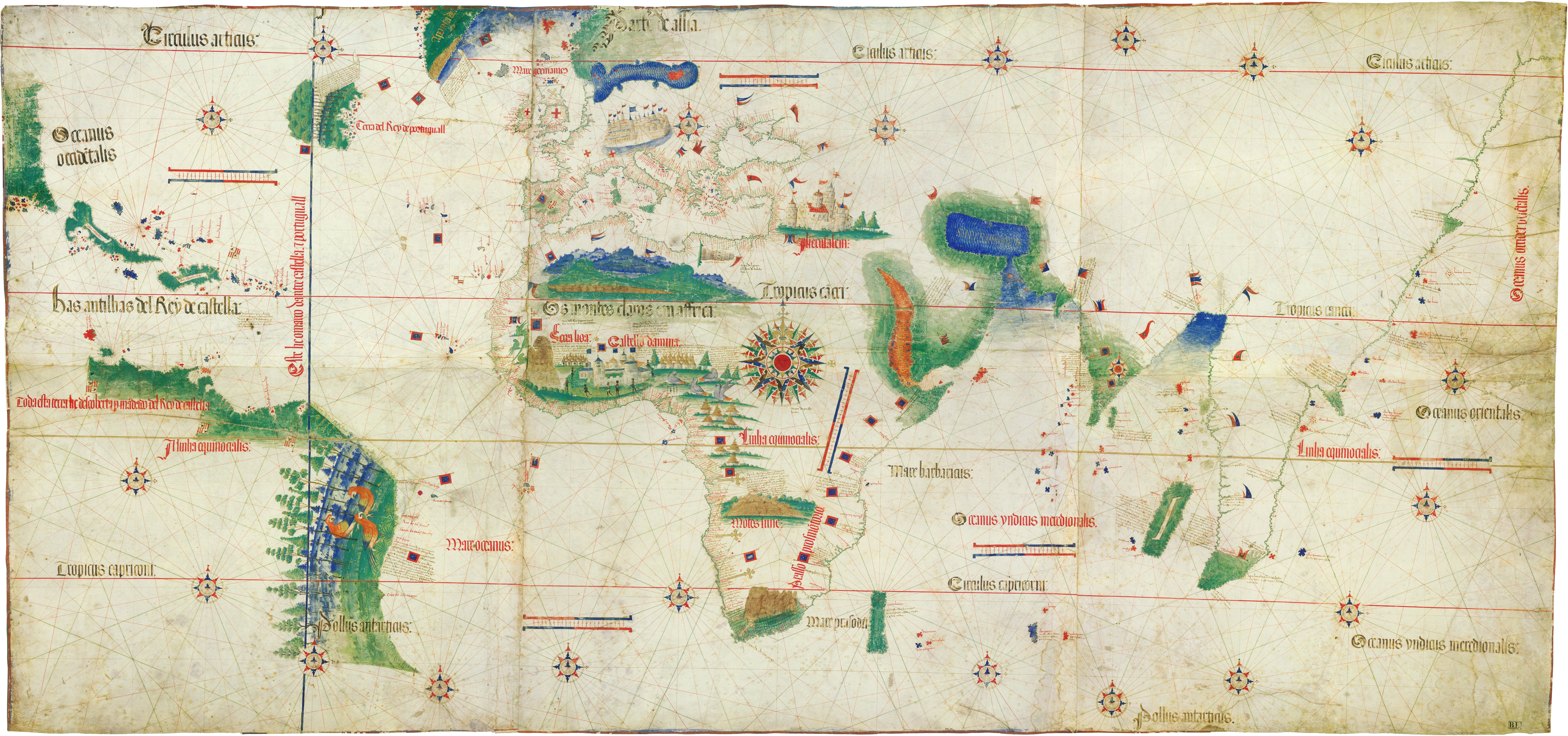
The Cantino planisphere of 1502 shows the line of the Treaty of Tordesillas.

An important but unanticipated effect of this papal bull and the Treaty of Tordesillas was that nearly all the Pacific Ocean and the west coast of North America were given to Spain. King John II naturally declined to enter into a hopeless competition at Rome, and simply ignored the bulls, thus neither admitting their authority nor defying the Church. According to Oskar Spate, if Rome was in Ferdinand's pocket, highly placed personages at the Spanish Court were in King John's, and kept him well informed of its moves. Controlling the sea lanes from Spain to the Antilles and in possession of bases in the Azores and Madeira, Portugal occupied a strategic naval position and he chose to pursue negotiations.

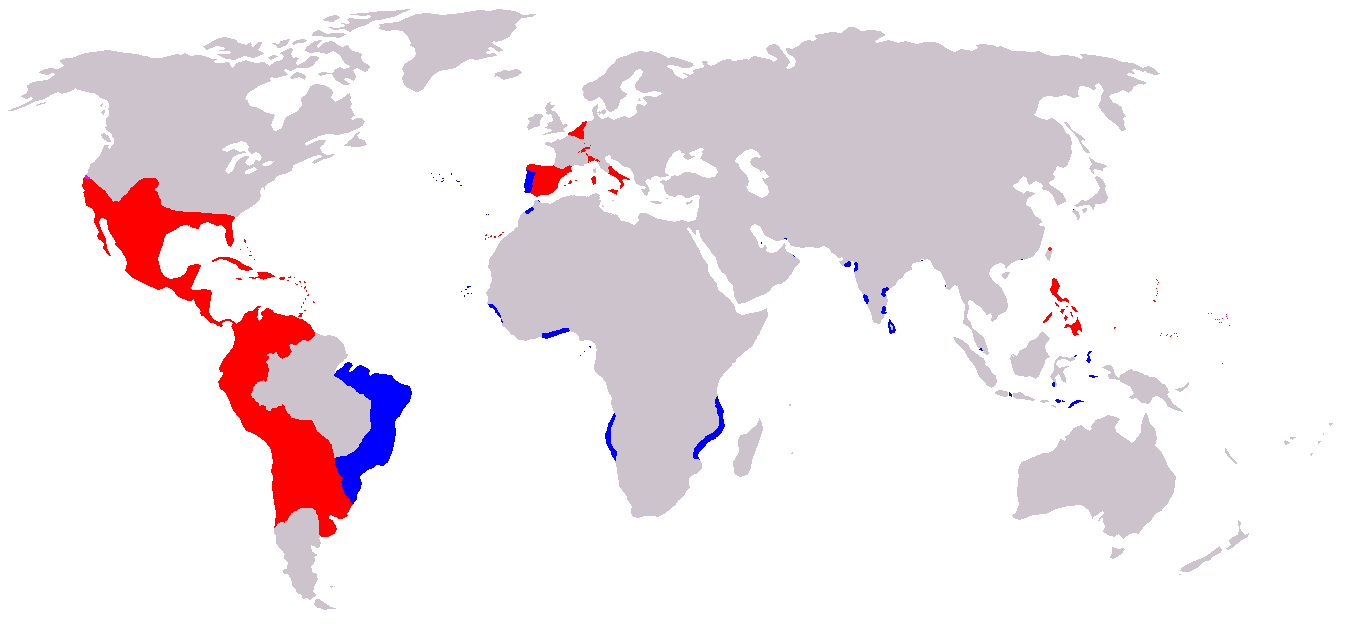
A map of the Spanish (red) and Portuguese Empires (blue) in the period of their personal union (1581–1640)

Neither side paid any attention to Pope Alexander's bulls. Instead, they negotiated the 1494 Treaty of Tordesillas, which moved the line further west to a meridian 370 leagues west of the Portuguese Cape Verde Islands, now explicitly giving Portugal all newly discovered lands east of the line.

In response to Portugal's discovery of the Spice Islands in 1512, the Spanish put forward the idea, in 1518, that Pope Alexander had divided the world into two halves. By this time, however, other European powers had overwhelmingly rejected the notion that the Pope had the right to convey sovereignty of regions as vast as the New World. Even within Spain, influential voices such as Francisco de Vitoria had denounced the validity of the Inter caetera. While Spain never gave up its claims based on papal bulls, neither did the Spanish crown seek papal sanctions over the Atlantic Ocean line of demarcation. Rather, Spain negotiated directly with Portugal.

=== Piis fidelium ===
On 25 June 1493, King Ferdinand secured another papal bull, Piis fidelium, appointing him apostolic vicar in the Indies. Father Bernardo Buil of the Order of Minims left Cádiz for America on 25 September 1493, on the second Columbus expedition. Once on the island of Hispaniola, Buil saw the effects of the conquistadors and quarreled with Columbus over the harsh treatment of colonists and Indians. Seeing that the situation for evangelization and catechizing was impossible, Buil left for Spain, defeated, within six months on 3 December 1494. Two other friars whom he had left in the Americas returned to Spain in 1499.

== Legacy and reaction ==
This authorization to take non-Christian peoples' lands was cited by U.S. Chief Justice John Marshall almost 300 years later as he was developing the discovery doctrine in international law.

In the 21st century, groups such as the Shawnee, Lenape, Taíno, and Kanaka Maoli organised protests and raised petitions seeking to repeal the papal bull Inter caetera, and to remind Catholic leaders of "the record of conquest, disease and slavery in the Americas, sometimes justified in the name of Christianity", which they say has a devastating effect on their cultures today.

== See also ==
- Catholic Church and the Age of Discovery
- Portuguese colonization of the Americas
- Treaty of Zaragoza
