= Ea quae pro bono pacis =

1506 papal bull by Julius II

Ea quae pro bono pacis (transl. For the promotion of peace) was a bull issued by Pope Julius II on 24 January 1506 by which the Treaty of Tordesillas, which divided the world unknown to Europeans between Portugal and Spain, was approved and ratified by the Catholic Church. Prior, the Treaty of Tordesillas had lacked papal approval because it countered previous bulls issued by Pope Alexander VI. The request of confirmation came from the king of Portugal Manuel I, and therefore the bull is addressed to the chief Portuguese bishops. The title for the bull came from the treaty's intention to "foster peace" between the two Catholic monarchies and solve colonial disputes between them.

== See also ==
- Treaty of Tordesillas
