= Casas del Tratado de Tordesillas =

Conjoined palaces in Tordesillas, Spain

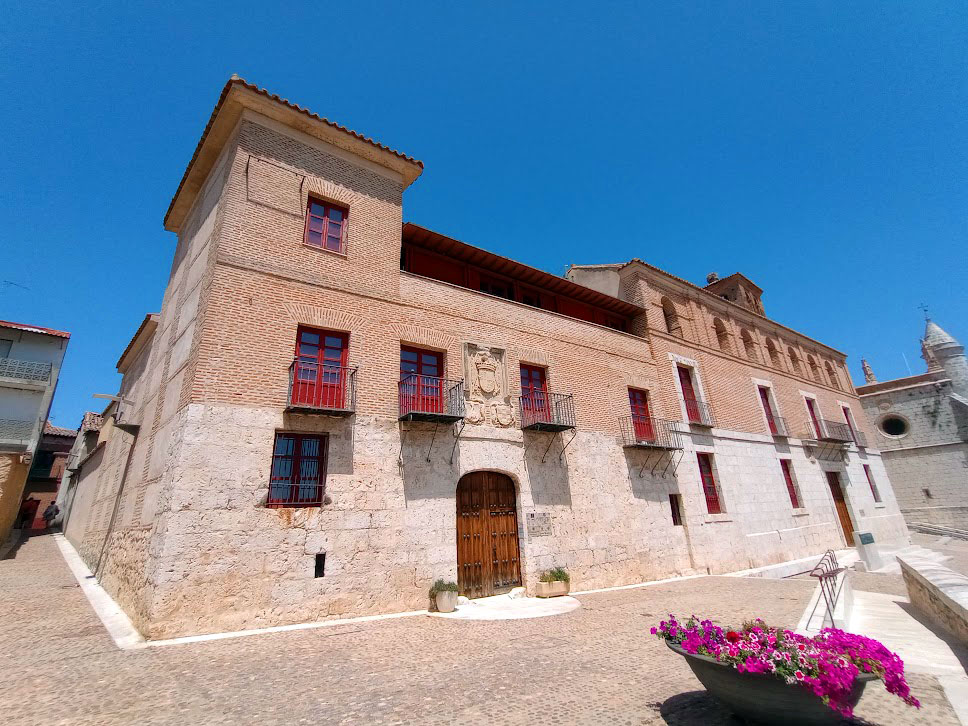
Casas del Tratado de Tordesillas

Casas del Tratado de Tordesillas (Houses of Treaty of Tordesillas in English) are two united palaces in Tordesillas, Spain. The negotiations that gave rise to the Treaty of Tordesillas took place there, through which Spain and Portugal shared the New World, giving rise to Ibero-America.

== History ==
On October 12, 1492, Christopher Columbus landed in the Bahamas. To determine Castilian rights in the territories newly found by Columbus, Isabella and Ferdinand approached Pope Alexander VI (Rodrigo Borgia). The Pope issued four bulls, known as the Alexandrian Bulls. The Catholic monarchs and the Lusitanian monarch subsequently negotiated a bilateral treaty. Delegations met for several months in Tordesillas, in the current province of Valladolid. According to the Portuguese chronicler García de Resende, the Portuguese ambassadors received secret reports from Lisbon on what would be the negotiating position of the Castilians with direct instructions from King Juan. The delegates of both monarchies signed a treaty on June 7, 1494, which is today called the Treaty of Tordesillas.

== Buildings ==
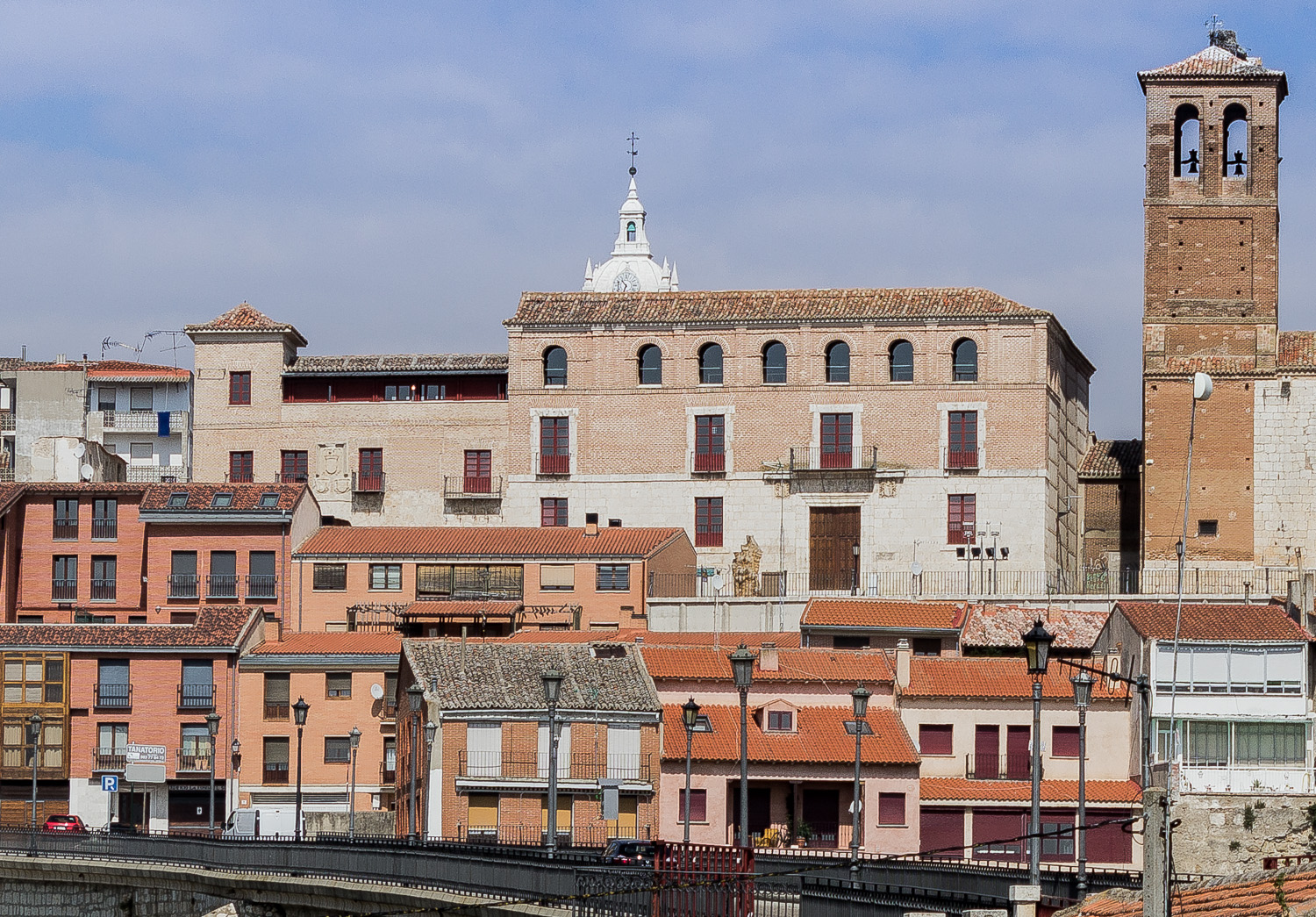
View of the houses; on the right you can see the tower of the Church Museum of San Antolín.

The oldest palace dates from the end of the 15th century. Its façade conserves the coat of arms of the Catholic Monarchs. The other palace was built in the middle of the 17th century and was the residence of a wealthy family. Both were subjected to a major restoration in 1994, on the occasion of the 500th anniversary of the Treaty. Two years later they were declared assets of cultural interest. They are used for cultural and tourist reasons related to the treaty and the time of the Catholic Monarchs.

== See also ==
- Treaty of Tordesillas
