= Giovanni Tortelli =

Renaissance Humanist

Tortelli's Orthographia Graeca

Giovanni Tortellli, also known as Tortellius (circa 1400 – before 26 April 1466) was a Renaissance humanist, largely responsible for the creation of the Vatican Library, together with scholars such as Bessarion and Poggio Bracciolini.

== Biography ==
Born in Capolona near Arezzo, he studied Greek with Filelfo and Carlo Marsuppini in Florence and with Vittorino da Feltre in Mantua, perfected his Greek by spending five years in Greece between 1433 and 1438. In 1447 he came to Rome to work with Pope Nicholas V (Tommaso Parentucelli, 1447–1455). In 1453 he was named abbot in commenda of the abbey of San Sebastiano at Alatri, some 40 miles south of Rome, in what was then Campania. He restored and embellished the ancient monastery, where he may have spent much of the rest of his life. His major work, dedicated to Nicholas V, was the De Orthografia, a vast study of ancient Greek and Latin, antiquarian and erudite. Special attention is now giving to epigraphical and grammatical sources of De Orthographia: in the theoretical section, at the beginning of the treatise, Tortelli handed down some grammatical fragments ascribable to Pliny the Elder’s Dubius sermo and to Papirianus, both of which are sources in Priscianus’ De litteris. Tortelli attributed the existence of other fragments also to a Greek grammarian called Parthenius. Under the item "Archimedes" one can found one of the first witness of the new humanistic translation of the Archimedean corpus, made by Iacopo da San Cassiano in the first half of the 15th century.

== Relevant literature ==
- Onorato, Aldo, Gli Amici bolognesi di Giovanni Tortelli. Messina : Centro interdipartimentale di studi umanistici, 2003. 270 p.
- Raffarin-Dupuis, Anne. "Les" antiquaires" et les debuts de l'archeologie a la renaissance: la roma instaurata de flavio biondo.(edition, traduction, commentaire)." PhD diss., Paris 4, 1998.
- Raffarin, Anne. 2012. "Les Sources Antiques Confrontées Aux Sources Contemporaines Dans Les Annotations À L’italia Illustrata De Flavio Biondo Traduite En Italien Par Lucio Fauno." Camena
- Tome, Paola. "L'" Orthographia" di Giovanni Tortelli: studio dell'opera e delle fonti." (2012).
- Tomè, Paola. "Tortelli e Valla: tra epigrafia e ortografia." Revue d'Histoire des Textes 8 (2013): 387–413.
- Tomè, Paola. "Papiri (an) us, Paperinus, Papirinus e l’«Orthographia» di Giovanni Tortelli." Revue d'Histoire des Textes 6 (2011): 167-210.
- Tomè, Paola. "Carlo Marsuppini nell'Orthographia di Giovanni Tortelli." (2013): 11–20. Studi rinascimentali : rivista internazionale di letteratura italiana : 11: 11-20
