= Dudum siquidem =

Papal bull issued by Pope Alexander VI

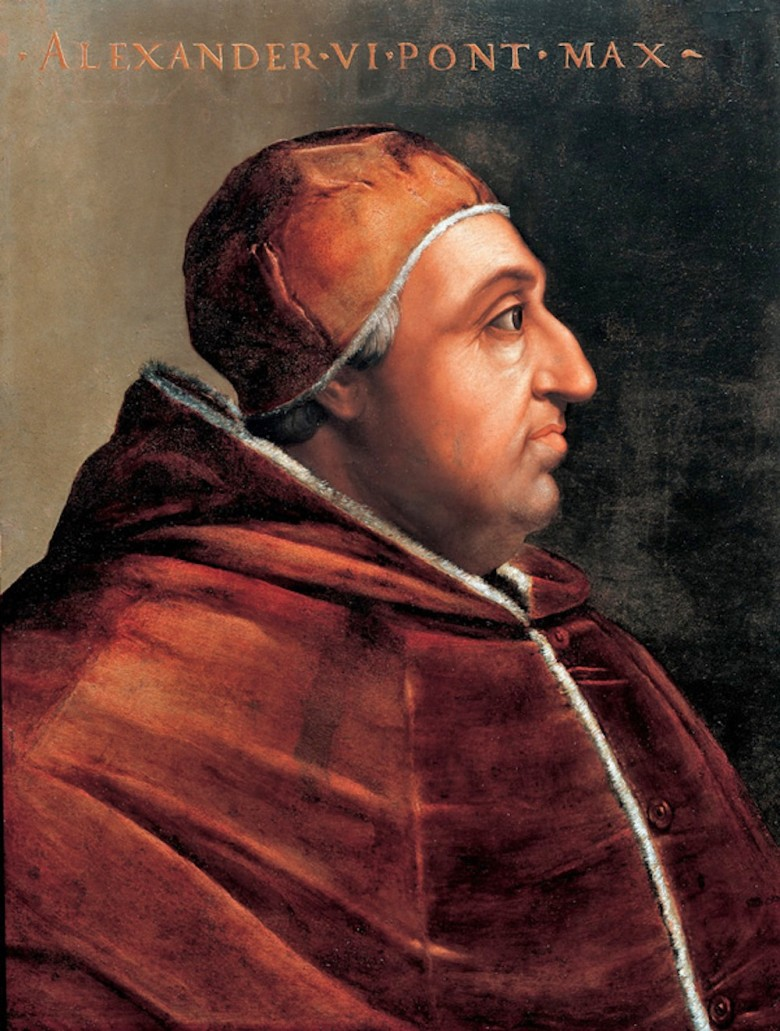
Pope Alexander VI

Dudum siquidem (Latin for "A short while ago") was a papal bull issued by Pope Alexander VI on 26 September 1493, one of the Bulls of Donation addressed to the Catholic Monarchs Isabella I of Castile and Ferdinand II of Aragon which supplemented the bull Inter caetera and granted to them "all islands and mainlands whatsoever, found and to be found, discovered and to be discovered, that are or may be or may seem to be in the route of navigation or travel towards the west or south, whether they be in western parts, or in the regions of the south and east and of India".

== Background ==
The bull Aeterni regis of 1481, delivered by Pope Sixtus IV, had confirmed the substance of the Treaty of Alcáçovas, which itself had confirmed Castile in its possession of the Canary Islands and had granted to Portugal all further new lands to be won by Christendom in Africa and the East Indies.

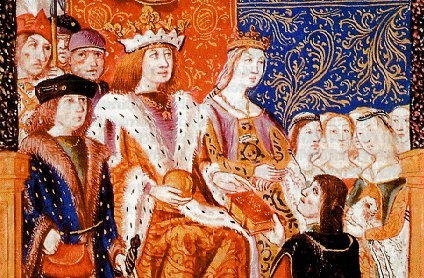
Ferdinand and Isabella, to whom the bull is addressed

At the beginning of the year 1492 the Christian reconquest of Spain was completed by the capture of Granada. The voyages of Christopher Columbus, seeking a westerly route to the riches of the Indies, began in the summer of the same year, and on 12 October Columbus sighted land in the West Indies which he believed to be part of India. He returned to Spain, with news of what he had found, in March 1493. Columbus's discoveries in the annus mirabilis created a competitive frenzy between the two principal sea-powers of the day, Portugal and the new Spanish kingdom based in Castile and Aragon.

A papal bull delivered on 4 May 1493, Inter caetera, attempted to divide the non-Christian world beyond Europe between Portugal and Spain, from the point of view of future conquests. Among much else, it states:

Among other works well pleasing to the Divine Majesty and cherished of our heart, this assuredly ranks highest, that in our times especially the Catholic faith and the Christian religion be exalted and be everywhere increased and spread, that the health of souls be cared for and that barbarous nations be overthrown and brought to the faith itself ...you should appoint to the aforesaid mainlands and islands worthy, God-fearing, learned, skilled, and experienced men, in order to instruct the aforesaid inhabitants and residents in the Catholic faith and train them in good morals.

This papal command signalled the beginning of the Spanish colonization of much of the New World. An important, although accidental, effect of the combination of this papal bull and of the Treaty of Tordesillas was that nearly all of the Pacific Ocean and the west coast of North America (the existence of both of which was still unknown) were allotted to Spain. However, it is still unclear whether the pope was issuing, so far as he could, a gift of sovereignty or a feudal infeodation or investiture. Differing interpretations have been argued.

The Spanish are thought to have requested an extension to what they had already been granted by the pope because they foresaw that there were richer territories still to be discovered than those which were yet known. In August 1493 the Portuguese ambassadors Pero Dias and Rui de Pina were in Barcelona negotiating with the Spanish over several issues, including the Portuguese intention to send a fleet to the New World to capture the islands discovered by Columbus, when Ferdinand and Isabella sent an appeal to the pope which resulted in the granting of Dudum siquidem, dated 26 September.

The day before, on 25 September, Columbus had sailed from Cádiz on his second voyage of exploration, at the head of a fleet of seventeen ships containing some 1,200 people. Many of them were passengers who intended to make a new life in the Indies.

== Provisions ==
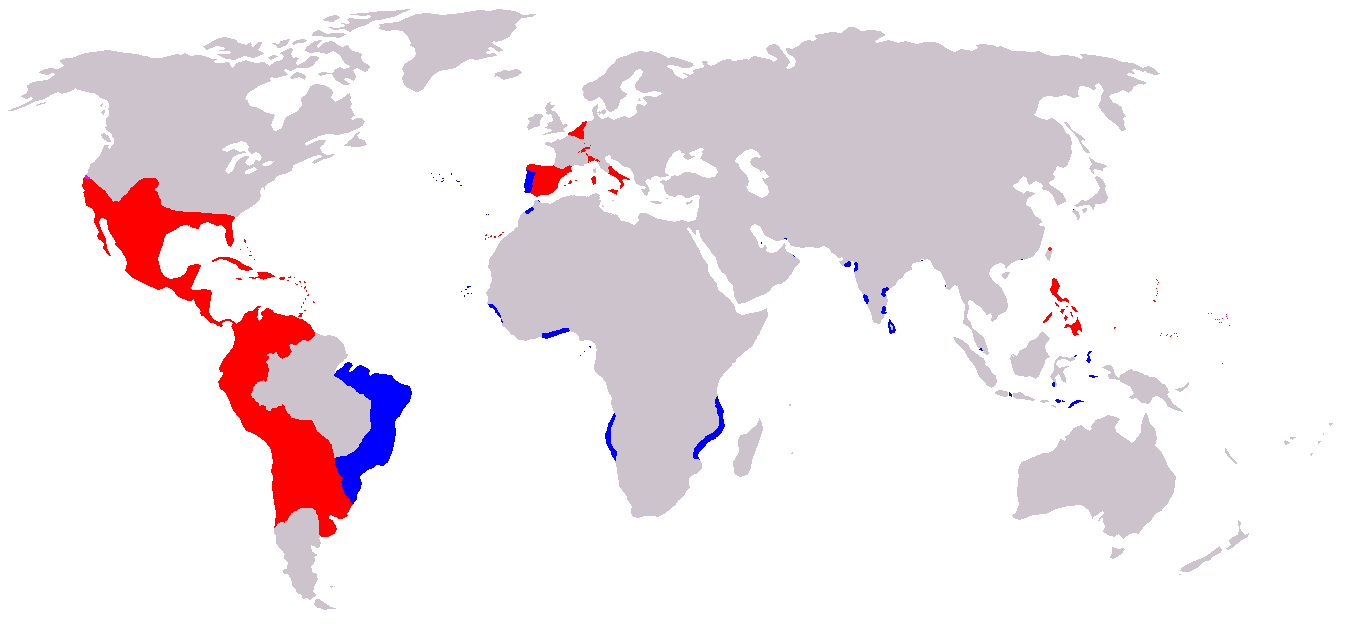
The Spanish (red) and Portuguese (blue) empires about 1600, not showing the unsettled areas claimed by Spain

The bull Dudum siquidem, which is also known as the "extension of the donation", extending the land grants of Inter caetera, foresees that "it may happen that your envoys and captains, or vassals, while voyaging towards the west or the south, might bring their ships to land in eastern regions and there discover islands and mainlands that belonged or belong to India". In view of that, the pope adds to his previous grants to Ferdinand and Isabella

...just as if in the aforesaid letters full and express mention had been made thereof, we do in like manner amplify and extend our aforesaid gift, grant, assignment, and letters, with all and singular the clauses contained in the said letters, to all islands and mainlands whatsoever, found and to be found, discovered and to be discovered, that are or may be or may seem to be in the route of navigation or travel towards the west or south, whether they be in western parts, or in the regions of the south and east and of India. We grant to you and your aforesaid heirs and successors full and free power through your own authority, exercised through yourselves or through another or others, freely to take corporal possession of the said islands and countries and to hold them forever, and to defend them against whosoever may oppose.

== Effect ==
Pope Alexander VI was himself a native of Valencia in Spain, and his bulls seem to have been intended to assist Spanish expansion more than that of Portugal. While he confirmed the concessions already granted to the Portuguese, the pope's Dudum siquidem increased the rights of Spain to the prejudice of Portugal. The specific mention of India caused consternation in Portugal, which mounted a diplomatic campaign aimed at damage limitation. The pope refused to reconsider his position, so King John II of Portugal negotiated directly with Ferdinand and Isabella, accepting Inter caetera as the starting point. This resulted in an agreement to move the boundary line established in Inter caetera 270 leagues further to the west, given effect as the Treaty of Tordesillas.

In later centuries Dudum siquidem was understood as giving Spain a free hand in the Pacific Ocean. It developed a long-term presence there, especially in the Philippines.

== Texts ==
According to the American historian Frances Gardiner Davenport, no copy of this bull has been found in the records of the Vatican, but in the General Archive of the Indies in Seville two original manuscripts of it survive, both with the papal lead seal attached, although not marked "Registrata", as is usual. Until these originals of the bull were revealed during the 20th century, there was some doubt about the authenticity of what had been quoted from it.

== See also ==
- Bulls of Donation
- Catholic Church and the Age of Discovery
- History of the west coast of North America
- Portuguese colonization of the Americas
- Portuguese Empire
- Spanish Empire
