= Treaty of Tordesillas =

1494 treaty dividing the unclaimed world between Spanish and Portuguese sovereignty

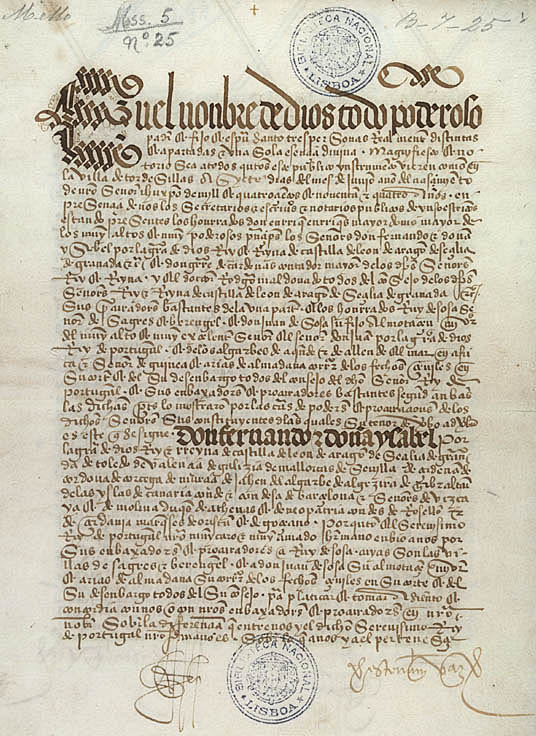
- Front page of the Portuguese-owned treaty; this page is written in Spanish
- Created: 7 June 1494; 532 years ago in Tordesillas, Spain
- Ratified: 2 July 1494 in Spain; 5 September 1494 in Portugal; 24 January 1506 by Pope Julius II
- Signatories: Ferdinand II of Aragon; Isabella I of Castile; John, Prince of Asturias; John II of Portugal
- Purpose: To resolve the conflict that arose from the 1481 papal bull Aeterni regis which affirmed Portuguese claims to all non-Christian lands south of the Canary Islands after Columbus claimed the Antilles for Castile, and to divide trading and colonising rights for all lands located west of the Canary Islands between Portugal and Castile (later applied between the Spanish Crown and Portugal) to the exclusion of any other Christian empires.

The Treaty of Tordesillas, (Note: Spanish: Tratado de Tordesillas [tɾaˈtaðo ðe toɾðeˈsiʎas]; Portuguese: Tratado de Tordesilhas [tɾɐˈtaðu ðɨ tuɾðeˈziʎɐʃ].) signed in Tordesillas, Spain, on 7 June 1494, and ratified in Setúbal, Portugal, divided the newly discovered lands outside Europe between the Kingdom of Portugal and the Crown of Castile, along a meridian 370 leagues (c. 2,100 km or 1,300 mi) west of the Cape Verde islands, off the west coast of Africa. That line of demarcation was about halfway between Cape Verde (already Portuguese) and the islands visited by Christopher Columbus on his first voyage (claimed for Castile and León), thought then to be Cipangu and Antillia, but in fact Cuba and Hispaniola; the treaty itself does not mention Cipangu nor Antillia.

The lands to the east would belong to Portugal and the lands to the west to Castile, modifying an earlier bull by Pope Alexander VI. The treaty was signed on 7 June 1494, then ratified by Spain on 2 July 1494, by Portugal on 5 September 1494, and by Pope Julius II on 24 January 1506. The other side of the world was divided a few decades later by the Treaty of Zaragoza, signed on 22 April 1529, which specified the antimeridian to the line of demarcation specified in the Treaty of Tordesillas. Portugal and Spain largely respected the treaties, while the Indigenous peoples of the Americas did not acknowledge them.

The Treaty of Tordesillas was added by UNESCO to its Memory of the World international register in 2007. Originals of both treaties are kept at the General Archive of the Indies in Spain and at the Torre do Tombo National Archive in Portugal.

== Signing and enforcement ==
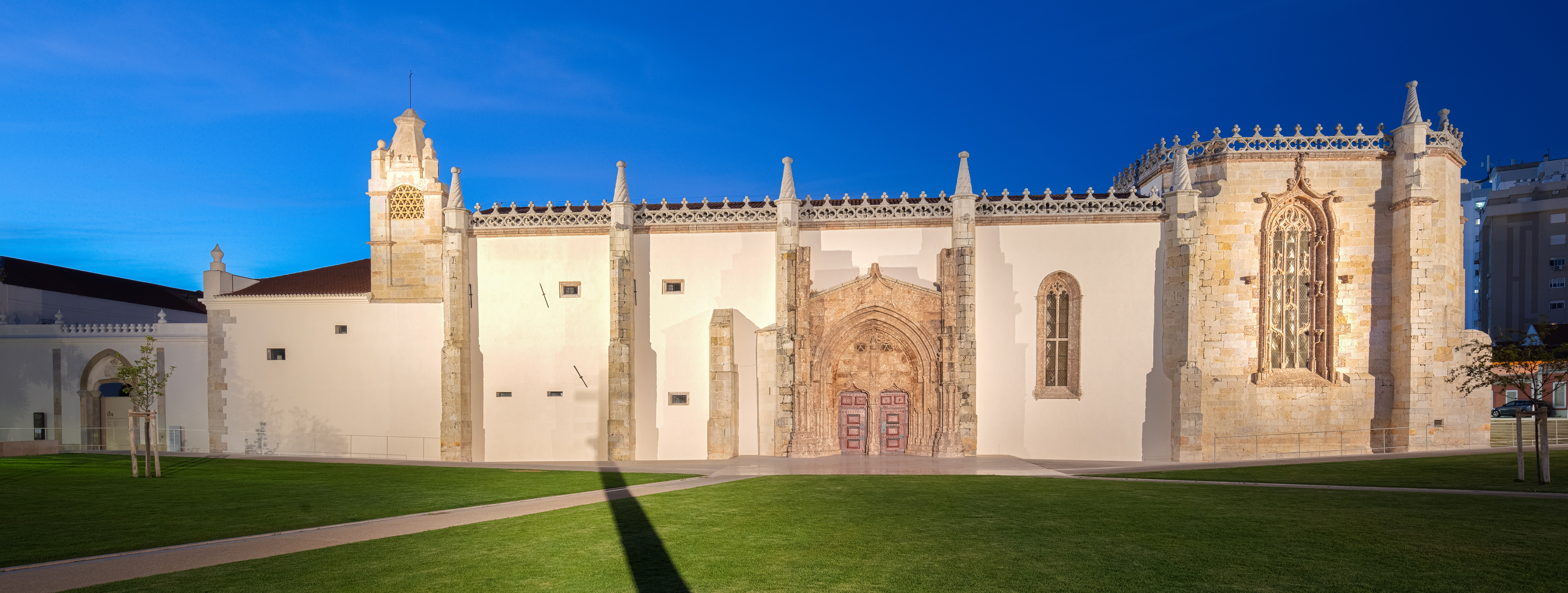
The convent in Setúbal, where the Portuguese king John II ratified the treaty in 1494.

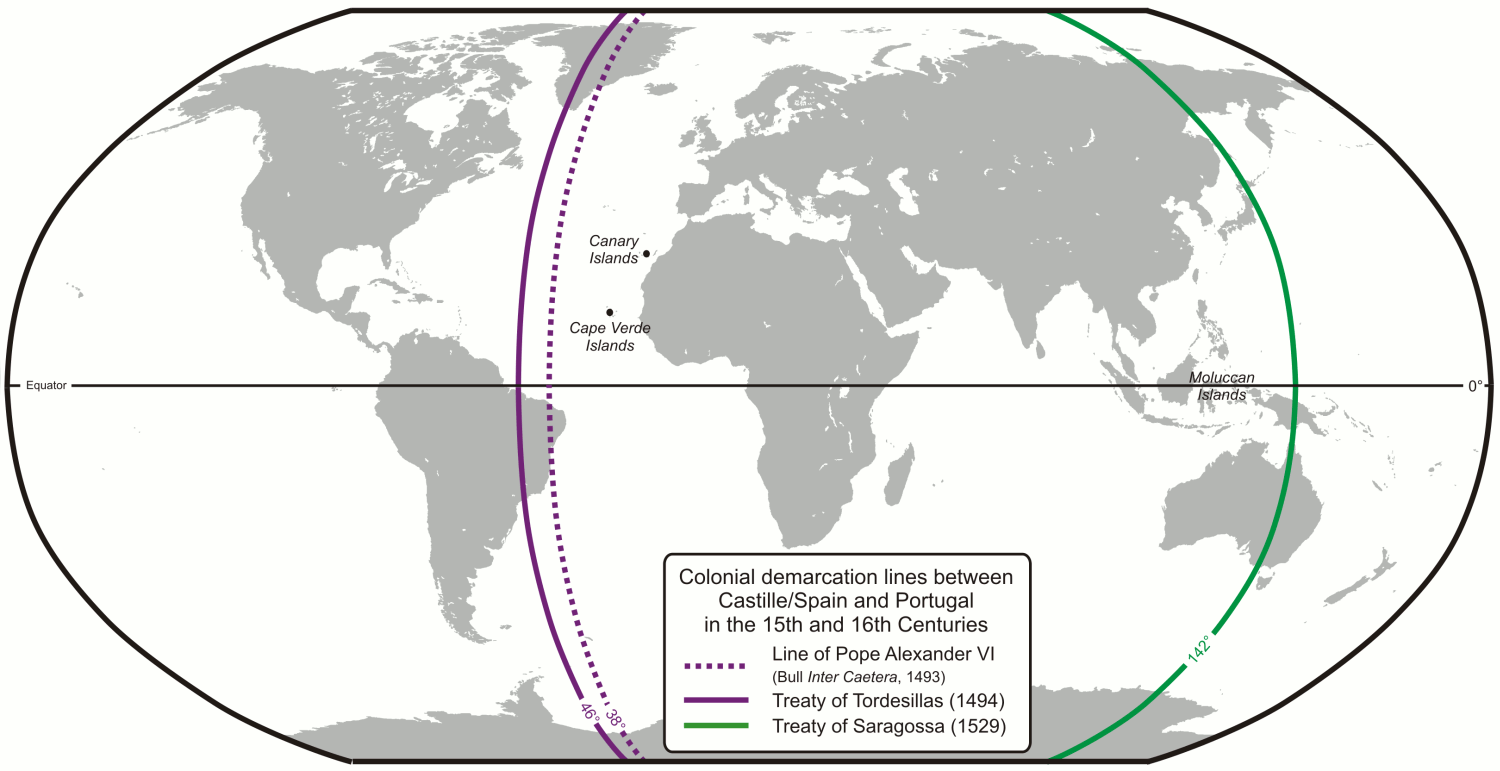
Lines dividing the non-Christian world between Castile and Portugal: the 1494 Tordesillas meridian (purple) and the 1529 Zaragoza antimeridian (green)

The Treaty of Tordesillas was intended to solve the dispute that arose following the return in 1493 of Christopher Columbus and his crew, who had sailed under the Crown of Castile, from their first voyage. On his way back to Spain, he first stopped at Lisbon, where he requested another meeting with King John II to prove to him that there were more islands to the southwest of the Canary Islands.

After learning of the Castilian-sponsored voyage, the Portuguese king sent a threatening letter to the Catholic Monarchs, King Ferdinand and Queen Isabella, stating that by the Treaty of Alcáçovas signed in 1479 and by the 1481 papal bull Aeterni regis that granted all lands south of the Canary Islands to Portugal, all of the lands discovered by Columbus belonged to Portugal. The Portuguese king also stated that he was already making arrangements for a fleet (an armada led by Francisco de Almeida) to depart shortly and take possession of the new lands. The Spanish rulers replied that Spain owned the islands discovered by Columbus and warned King John II not to permit anyone from Portugal to go there. Finally, the rulers invited Portugal to send ambassadors to begin diplomatic negotiations aimed at settling the rights of each nation in the Atlantic.

On 4 May 1493, Pope Alexander VI (Rodrigo Borgia), an Aragonese from Valencia by birth, decreed in the bull Inter caetera that all lands west of a pole-to-pole line 100 leagues west of any of the islands of the Azores or the Cape Verde Islands should belong to Castile, although territory under Christian rule as of Christmas 1492 would remain untouched. The bull did not mention Portugal or its lands, so Portugal could not claim newly discovered lands even if they were east of the line. Another bull, Dudum siquidem, entitled Extension of the Apostolic Grant and Donation of the Indies and dated 25 September 1493, gave all mainlands and islands, "at one time or even still belonging to India" to Spain, even if east of the line.

The Portuguese King John II was not pleased with that arrangement, feeling that it gave him far too little land—it prevented him from possessing India, his near-term goal. By 1493, Portuguese explorers had reached the southern tip of Africa, the Cape of Good Hope. The Portuguese were unlikely to go to war over the islands encountered by Columbus, but the explicit mention of India was a major issue. As the Pope had not made changes, the Portuguese king opened direct negotiations with the Catholic Monarchs to move the line to the west and allow him to claim newly discovered lands east of the line. In the bargain, John accepted Inter caetera as the starting point of discussion with Ferdinand and Isabella but had the boundary line moved 270 leagues west ('leagues' being undefined), in order to protect the Portuguese route down the coast of Africa and giving the Portuguese rights to lands that now constitute the eastern quarter of Brazil. As one scholar assessed the results, "both sides must have known that so vague a boundary could not be accurately fixed, and each thought that the other was deceived", concluding that it was a "diplomatic triumph for Portugal, confirming to the Portuguese not only the true route to India, but most of the South Atlantic".

Mare clausum ('closed sea') claims during the Age of Discovery.

The treaty was negotiated without consulting Pope Alexander VI and effectively superseded his bulls. However, it was subsequently sanctioned by his successor Pope Julius II by means of the bull Ea quae pro bono pacis of 24 January 1506 and therefore some sources call the resulting line the "Papal Line of Demarcation".

Very little of the newly divided area had actually been seen by Europeans, as it was only divided via the treaty. Castile gained lands including most of the Americas, which in 1494 had little proven wealth. The easternmost part of current Brazil was granted to Portugal when in 1500 Pedro Álvares Cabral landed there while he was en route to India. Some historians contend that the Portuguese already knew of the South American bulge that makes up most of Brazil before this time, so his landing in Brazil was not an accident. One scholar points to Cabral's landing on the Brazilian coast 12 degrees farther south than the expected Cape São Roque, such that "the likelihood of making such a landfall as a result of freak weather or a navigational error was remote; and it is highly probable that Cabral had been instructed to investigate a coast whose existence was not merely suspected, but already known".

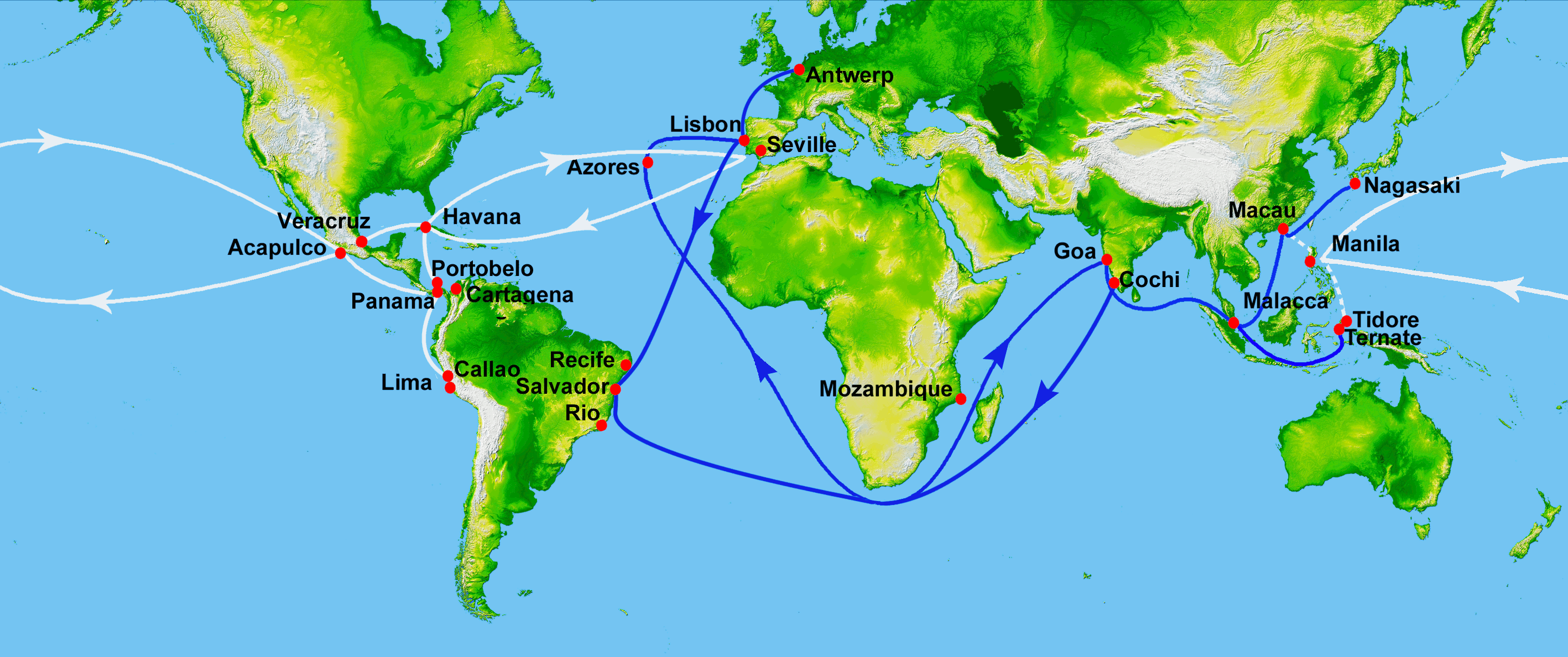
Portuguese India Armadas and trade routes (blue) since Vasco da Gama's 1498 journey and the Spanish Manila-Acapulco galleons trade routes (white) established in 1568

The line was not strictly enforced—the Spanish did not resist the Portuguese expansion of Brazil across the meridian. However, Spain attempted to stop the Portuguese advance in Asia, by claiming the meridian line ran around the world, dividing the whole world in half rather than just the Atlantic. Portugal pushed back, seeking another papal pronouncement that limited the line of demarcation to the Atlantic. This was given by Pope Leo X, who was friendly toward Portugal and its discoveries, in 1514 in the bull Praecelsae devotionis.

The divided possessions sanctioned by the treaty continued, even when Spain and Portugal were united under a single king between 1580 and 1640, until the treaty was superseded by the 1750 Treaty of Madrid.

Emerging Protestant maritime powers, particularly England and The Netherlands, and other third parties such as Catholic France, did not recognize the division of the world between only two Catholic nations brokered by the pope.

== Tordesillas meridian ==
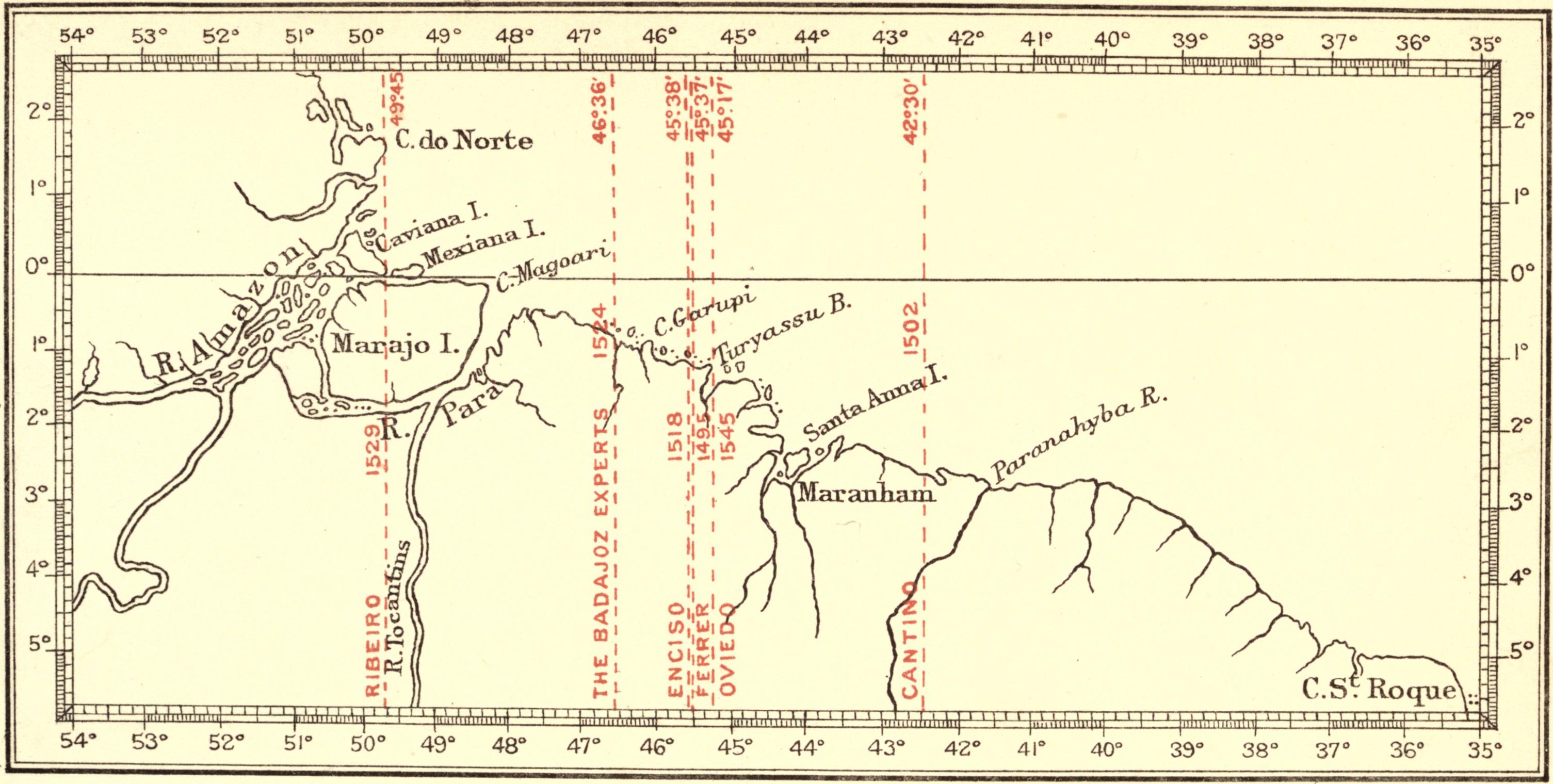
Various Spanish and Portuguese reckonings of the Tordesillas line (1495–1545) marked along the Brazilian coast, from Harrisse

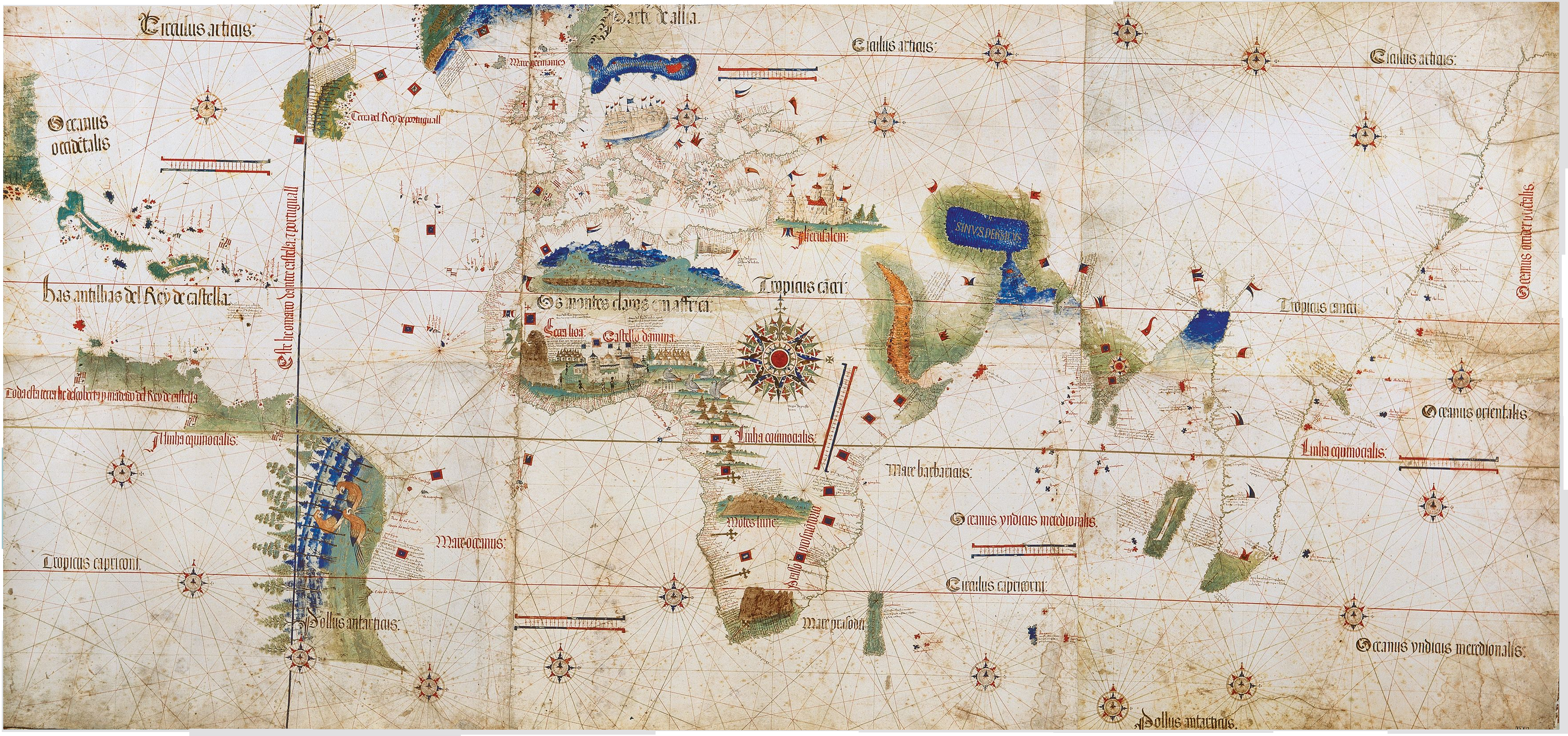
Cantino planisphere depicting the meridian, generally considered to represent the Portuguese Casa da Índia's official Padrão Real c. 1502

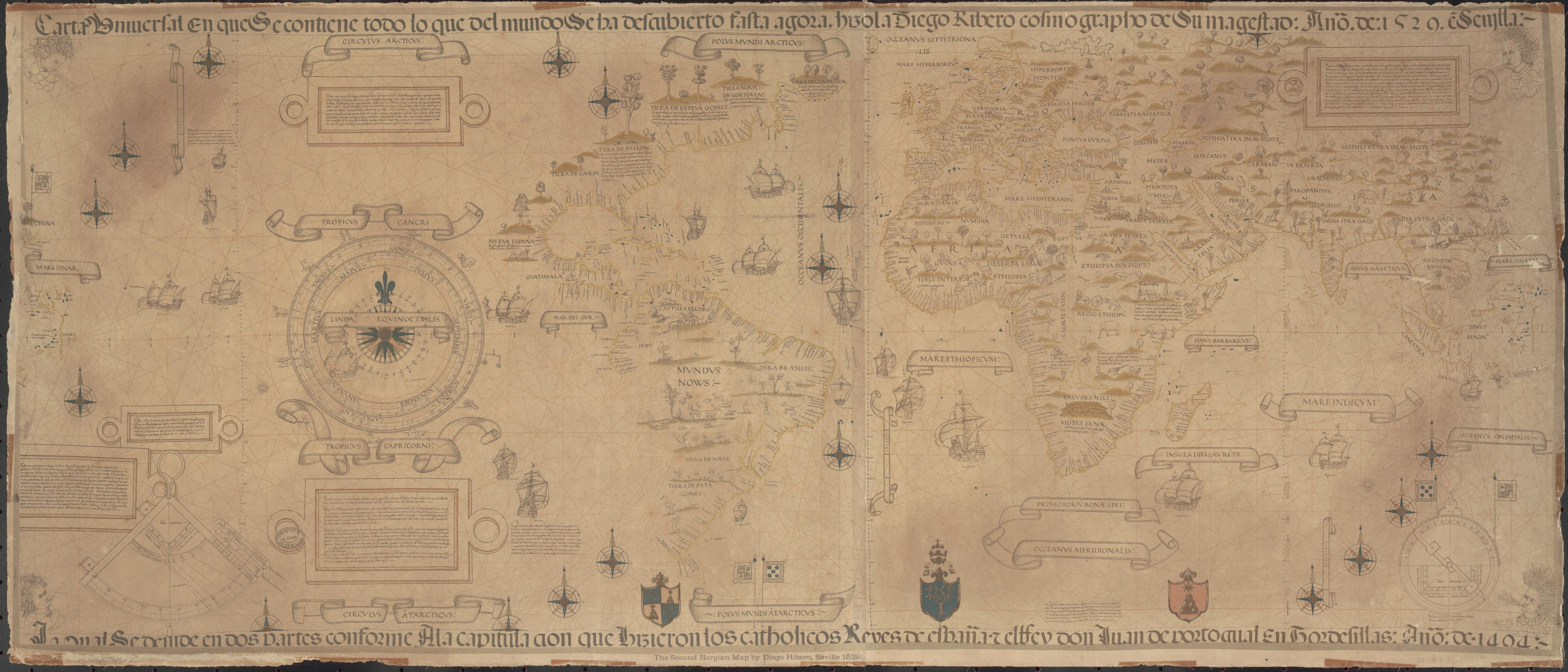
The 1529 Diogo Ribeiro world map, generally considered to represent the Padrón Real used for deciding the Treaty of Zaragoza

The Treaty of Tordesillas only specified the line of demarcation in leagues from the Cape Verde Islands. It did not specify the length of the league, its equivalent in equatorial degrees, or which of the Cape Verde islands was intended. Instead, the treaty provided that these matters were to be settled by a joint voyage. This voyage never occurred, and instead there were only a series of nonbinding expert opinions produced over the next several decades. Their computations were further complicated by remaining uncertainty about the exact equatorial circumference of the earth. As such, each proposed line can be variously computed using geographical leagues defined in terms of a degree using a ratio which applies regardless of the size of the earth or using a specifically measured league applied to the actual equatorial circumference of the earth, with allowances necessary for the imperfect Portuguese and Spanish knowledge of its true dimensions.

- The earliest Aragonese opinion was provided by Jaime Ferrer in 1495 at the request of Ferdinand and Isabella. He stated to them that the demarcation line was 18° west of the most central island of the Cape Verde Islands, equivalent to 24°25′ west of Greenwich. (Harrisse concludes Ferrer must have meant Fogo as this central island.) Thus, Ferrer placed the line at 42°25′ W. on his sphere, which was 21.1% larger than the actual size of the earth. Harrisse further concludes from Ferrer's claim that his league contained 32 Olympic stades (6.15264 km or 3.82307 mi) that his line—if perfectly measured—would have corresponded to a position 2,276.5 km (1,414.6 mi) west of Fogo at 47°37′ W.
- The earliest surviving Portuguese opinion is on the Cantino planisphere of 1501 or 1502, generally considered to represent the Portuguese standard map of its day. Because its demarcation line was midway between Cape Saint Roque, the northeast cape of South America, and the mouth of the Amazon River, labeled the Great River (Rio Grande) with an estuary marked "All of this sea is fresh water" (Todo este mar he de agua doçe), Harrisse computed that this line was at 42°30′ W. on the actual globe. Harrisse believed the large estuary just west of the line on the Cantino map was that of the Rio Maranhão (this estuary is now the Baía de São Marcos and the river is now the Mearim), whose flow is so weak that its gulf does not contain fresh water.
- In 1518, another Castilian opinion was provided by Martin Fernández de Enciso. Harrisse computes that Enciso's sphere was 7.7% smaller than the actual size of the earth so his line at 47°24′ W. corresponds to the actual 45°38′ W. based on his other numerical data. Enciso further described the coastal features near which the line passed, but in a very confused manner that might place the line as far west as the mouth of the Amazon between 49°W and 50°W.
- In 1524, the Castilian mathematician Tomás Durán and pilots Sebastian Cabot (son of John Cabot) and Juan Vespucci (nephew of Amerigo Vespucci) gave their opinion to the conference at Badajoz, whose failure to resolve the dispute led to the Treaty of Zaragoza. The pilots specified that the line should be understood as 22° plus about 9 Spanish miles (12.5388 km or 7.7912 mi) west of the center of Santo Antão, the westernmost Cape Verde island. Based on their understanding of the equator, Harrisse concludes they intended 47°17′ W. on their sphere (3.1% smaller than ours) or 46°36′W on the actual globe.
- At the same conference, the Portuguese presented a globe on which the line was marked as 21°30′ west of Santo Antão, which would place it at 47°16′52″ W. when adjusted to match the actual circumference of the earth, nearly identical to the Spanish suggestion. However, the Badajoz conference disbanded without reaching any formal settlement on any issue.
- The 1529 Treaty of Zaragoza, agreed to by the Spanish king Charles I (Emperor Charles V) and John III of Portugal, implicitly assumes within its measurements of a new eastern line that the leagues of the two treaties should be understood as a geographical league equivalent to 4/70th of an equatorial degree, placing the line between 43°56′ and 46°18′ W. depending on the island chosen. Note, however, that the 1529 Diogo Ribeiro map—generally considered to represent the now-lost Spanish standard map used to finalize the agreement at Zaragoza—placed its own delineation of the Tordesillas agreement much further west, around 49°45′ W.
- The Treaty of Tordesillas was invoked by Chile in the 20th century to defend the principle of an Antarctic sector extending along a meridian to the South Pole, as well as the assertion that the treaty made Spanish (or Portuguese) all undiscovered land south to the Pole. The Chilean Antarctic Territory's eastern boundary is presently defined as the 53rd meridian west.

== Antimeridian: Moluccas and Treaty of Zaragoza ==
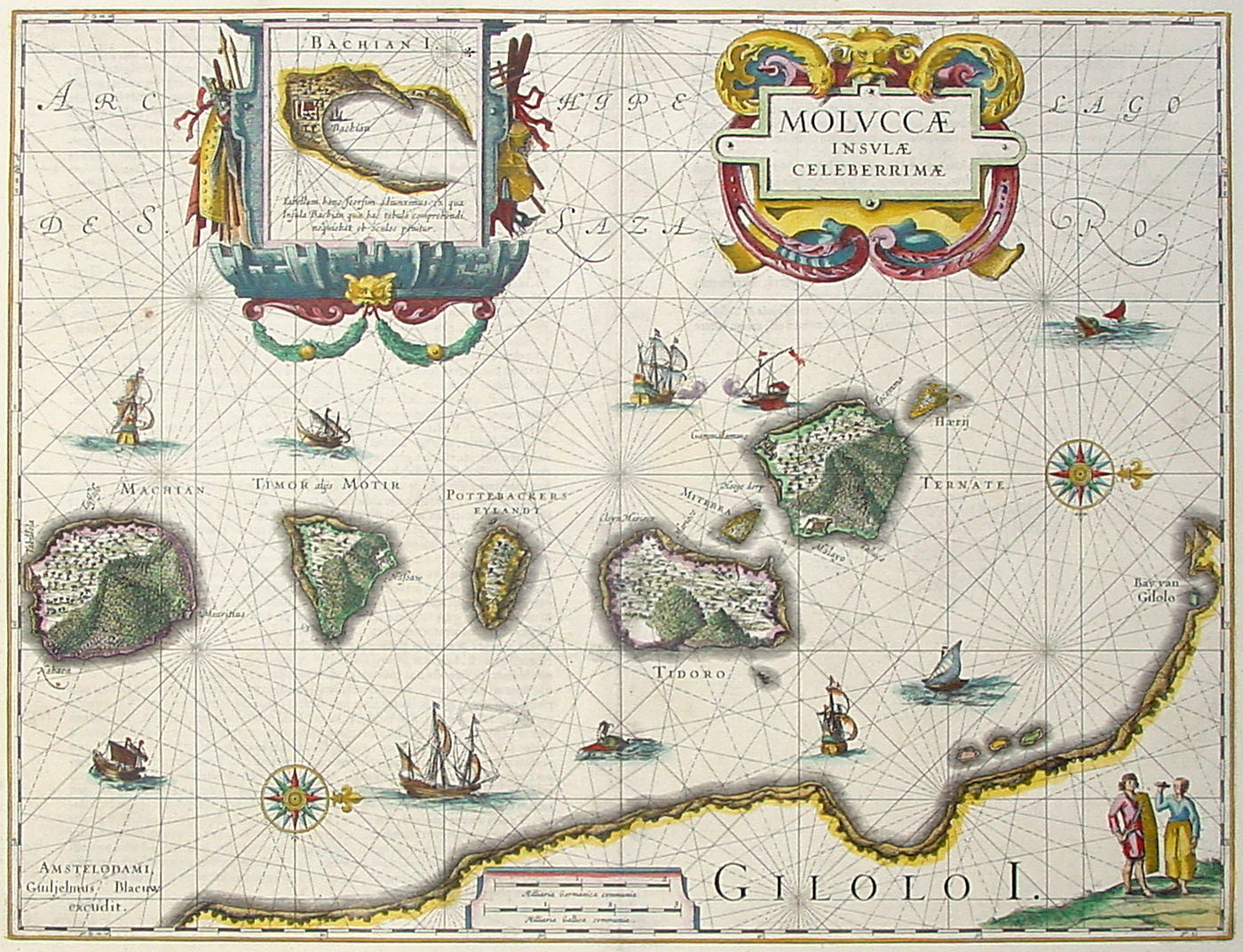
Dutch map of the Moluccas (north is at right)

Initially, the line of demarcation did not encircle the earth. Instead, Spain and Portugal could conquer any new lands they were the first to discover, Spain to the west and Portugal to the east, even if they passed each other on the other side of the globe. But Portugal's discovery of the highly valued Moluccas in 1512 caused Spain to argue in 1518 that the Treaty of Tordesillas divided the earth into two equal hemispheres. After the surviving ships of Magellan's fleet visited the Moluccas in 1521, Spain claimed that those islands were within its western hemisphere. The Treaty of Vitoria, negotiated between Spain and Portugal on 19 February 1524, called for the Junta of Badajoz to meet in an attempt to reach an agreement on the antimeridian, which ultimately failed. It was finally agreed in the Treaty of Zaragoza (or Saragossa), signed on 22 April 1529, that Spain would relinquish its claims to the Moluccas upon the payment of 350,000 ducats of gold (Note: Assuming the treaty reckoned its "350,000 ducats" as the era's Spanish ducados rather than Venetian ducats, this would have represented about 1220 kg of pure gold.) by Portugal to Spain. To prevent Spain from encroaching upon Portugal's Moluccas, the antimeridian was to be 297 1/2 leagues or 17° to the east of the Moluccas, passing through the islands of Las Velas and Santo Thome. This distance is slightly smaller than the 300 leagues determined by Magellan as the westward distance from los Ladrones to the Philippine island of Samar, which is just west of due north of the Moluccas.

The Moluccas are a group of islands west of New Guinea. However, unlike the large modern Indonesian archipelago of the Maluku Islands, to 16th-century Europeans the Moluccas were a small chain of islands, the only place on earth where cloves grew, just west of the large north Malukan island of Halmahera (called Gilolo at the time). Cloves were so prized by Europeans for the medicinal uses that they were worth their weight in gold. 16th- and 17th-century maps and descriptions indicate that the main islands were Ternate, Tidore, Moti, Makian and Bacan, although the last was often ignored even though it was by far the largest island. The principal island was Ternate at the chain's northern end (0°47′N, only 11 kilometres (7 mi) in diameter) on whose southwest coast the Portuguese built a stone fort (Forte de São João Baptista de Ternate) during 1522–23, (Note: After the Spanish-Portuguese Union (1580–1640) and the effective Dutch conquest of the Moluccas (1605–1611, pp. 152–153), the fort was destroyed by the Spanish in 1666 during their retreat to the Philippines. (p. 156)) which could only be repaired, not modified, according to the Treaty of Zaragoza. This north–south chain occupies two degrees of latitude bisected by the equator at about 127°24′E, with Ternate, Tidore, Moti, and Makian north of the equator and Bacan south of it.

Although the treaty's Santo Thome island has not been identified, its "Islas de las Velas" (Islands of the Sails) appear in a 1585 Spanish history of China, on the 1594 world map of Petrus Plancius, on an anonymous map of the Moluccas in the 1598 London edition of Linschoten, and on the 1607 world map of Petro Kærio, identified as a north–south chain of islands in the northwest Pacific, which were also called the "Islas de los Ladrones" (Islands of the Thieves) during that period. (Note: The islands were named both las Velas and los Ladrones in a quote from Father Juan González de Mendoza in Historia de las cosas más notables, ritos y costumbres del gran Reino de la China (History of the most remarkable things, rites and customs of the great Kingdom of China, 1585).) (Note: With detailed maps naming each island on several maps.) Their name was changed by Spain in 1667 to "Islas de las Marianas" (Mariana Islands), which include Guam at their southern end. Guam's longitude of 144°45′E is east of the Moluccas' longitude of 127°24′E by 17°21′, which is remarkably close by 16th-century standards to the treaty's 17° east. This longitude passes through the eastern end of the main north Japanese island of Hokkaido and through the eastern end of New Guinea, which is where Frédéric Durand placed the demarcation line. Moriarty and Keistman placed the demarcation line at 147°E by measuring 16.4° east from the western end of New Guinea (or 17° east of 130°E). Despite the treaty's clear statement that the demarcation line passes 17° east of the Moluccas, some sources place the line just east of the Moluccas.

The Treaty of Zaragoza did not modify or clarify the line of demarcation provided by the Treaty of Tordesillas, nor did it validate Spain's claim to equal hemispheres (180° each), so the two lines divided the earth into unequal hemispheres. Portugal's portion was roughly 191° whereas Spain's portion was roughly 169°. Both portions have a large uncertainty of ±4° because of the wide variation in the opinions regarding the location of the Tordesillas line.

Portugal gained control of all lands and seas west of the Zaragoza line, including all of Asia and its neighboring islands so far discovered, leaving Spain most of the Pacific Ocean. Although the Philippines were not named in the treaty, Spain implicitly relinquished any claim to them because they were well west of the line. Nevertheless, by 1542, Charles V decided to colonize the Philippines, judging that Portugal would not protest because the archipelago had no spices. Although a number of expeditions sent from New Spain arrived in the Philippines, they were unable to establish a settlement because the return route across the Pacific was unknown. King Philip II succeeded in 1565 when he sent Miguel López de Legazpi and Andrés de Urdaneta, establishing the initial Spanish trading post at Cebu and later founding Manila in 1571.

Besides Brazil and the Moluccas, Portugal eventually controlled Angola, Mozambique, Portuguese Guinea, and São Tomé and Príncipe (among other territories and bases) in Africa; several bases or territories such as Muscat, Ormus and Bahrain in the Persian Gulf, Goa, Bombay and Daman and Diu (among other coastal cities) in India; Ceylon, and Malacca, bases in present-day Indonesia including Makassar, Solor, Ambon, and Portuguese Timor, the entrepôt-base of Macau and the entrepôt-enclave of Dejima (Nagasaki) in the Far East.

Spain, on the other hand, would control vast western regions in the Americas, in areas ranging from the present-day United States to present-day Argentina, an empire that would extend to the Philippines, and bases in Ternate and Formosa (17th century).

Portuguese and Spanish empires (anachronous world maps)

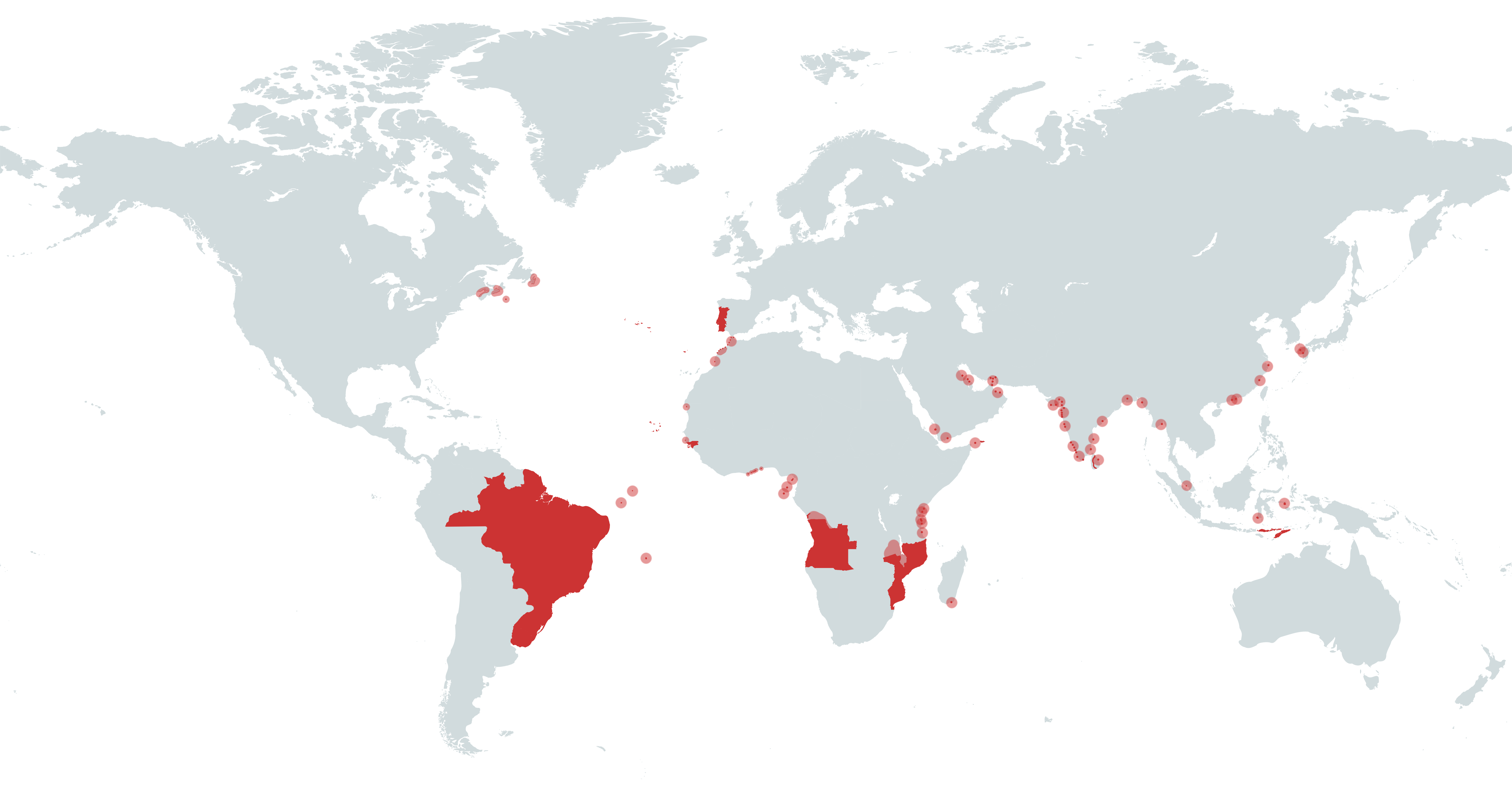
Portuguese Empire

Spanish Empire

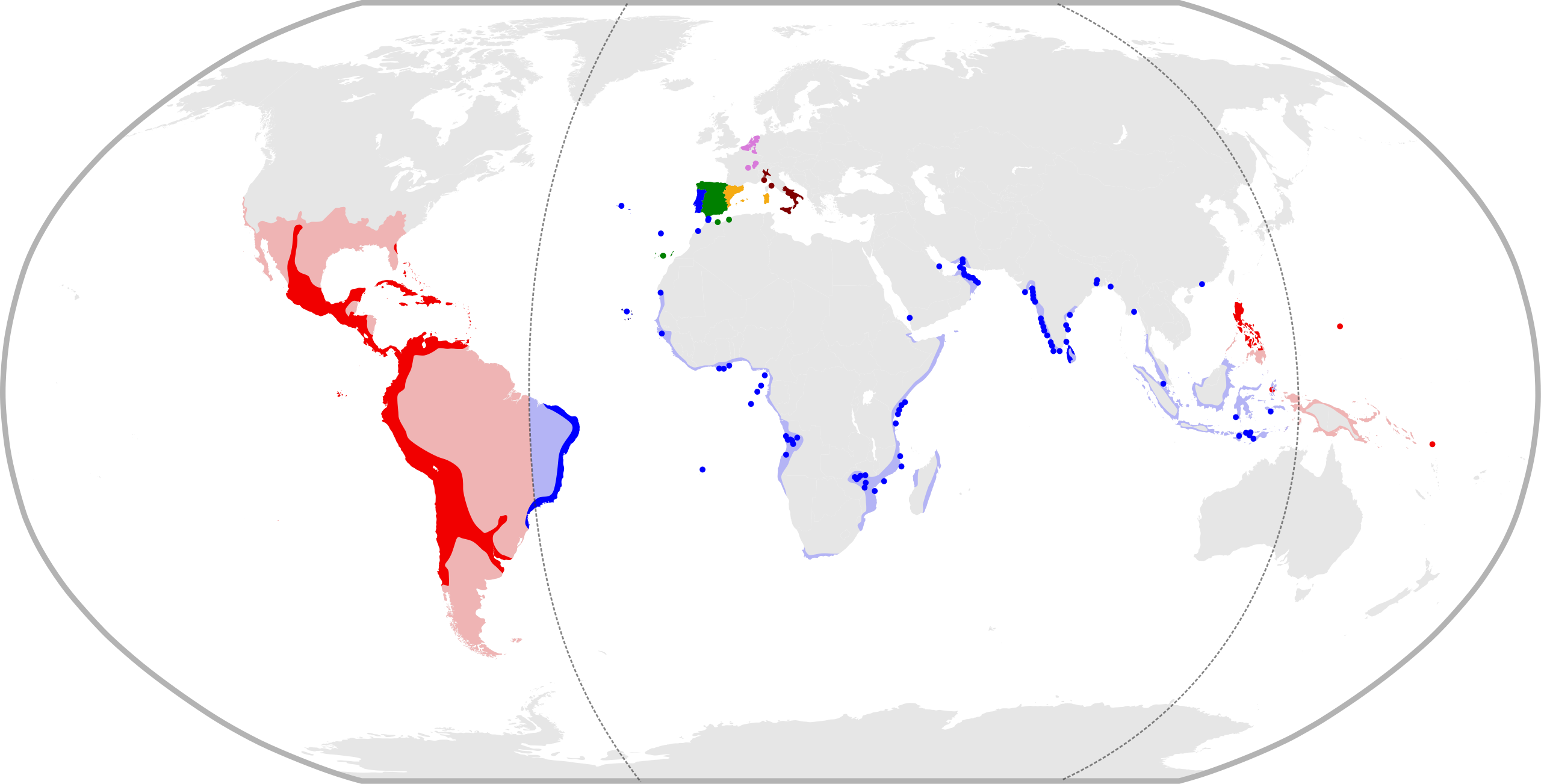
Iberian Union (1581–1640)

== Effect on other European powers ==
The attitude towards the treaty that other governments had was expressed by France's Francis I, who declared, "The sun shines for me as it does for others. I would very much like to see the clause of Adam's will by which I should be denied my share of the world."

== Treaty of Madrid ==
On 13 January 1750, King John V of Portugal and Ferdinand VI of Spain signed the Treaty of Madrid, in which both parties sought to establish the borders between Brazil and Spanish America, admitting that the Treaty of Tordesillas, as it had been envisioned in 1494, had been superseded, and was considered void. Spanish sovereignty was acknowledged over the Philippines, while Portugal would get the territory of the Amazon River basin. Portugal would relinquish the colony of Sacramento, on the left bank of the River Plata in modern-day Uruguay, while getting the territory of the Seven Missions.

Following the Guarani War, the treaty was annulled by Spain and Portugal in the Treaty of El Pardo (1761). The border was eventually settled in the First Treaty of San Ildefonso in 1777, with Spain acquiring territories east of the Uruguay River and Portugal acquiring territories in the Amazon Basin.

== See also ==
- Axis powers negotiations on the division of Asia, wherein Japan proposed splitting Asia along the 70th meridian east longitude with Nazi Germany
- Catholic Church and the Age of Discovery
- History of Portugal (1415–1578)
- List of treaties
- Houses of Treaty of Tordesillas
- 46th meridian west
