= Aeterni regis =

1481 papal bull

The papal bull Aeterni regis [English: "Of the eternal king's [grace]"] was issued on 21 June 1481 by Pope Sixtus IV. It confirmed the substance of the Treaty of Alcáçovas, reiterating that treaty's confirmation of Castile in its possession of the Canary Islands and its granting to Portugal all further territorial acquisitions made by Christian powers in Africa and eastward to the Indies.

== Background ==
The War of the Castilian Succession was fought between Portugal and Castile from 1475 to 1479 over who should succeed Henry IV of Castile, his daughter, Joanna or his half-sister, Isabella. Joanna was married to Afonso V of Portugal and Isabella was wed to Ferdinand II of Aragon. Underlying this were decades-long disagreements over hegemony of the Atlantic. Both kingdoms claimed territorial sovereignty over the Canary Islands and the West Coast of Africa. While Castile had some success in land battles, Portugal had the advantage at sea.

== Treaty of Alcaçovas ==
Through the good offices of Beatrice, Duchess of Viseu, first cousin of Afonso V and aunt to Isabella of Castile, the parties negotiated a settlement. A treaty was entered into at Alcáçovas, in southern Portugal, (at the house of Dona Beatrice), on 4 September 1479. Each side agreed to relinquish any claims to the other's kingdom. The agreement incorporated terms of a 1431 agreement regarding restitution of places, release of prisoners, and demolition of fortresses. In addition, Portugal ceded the Canaries to Castile, and Castile, in turn recognized Portugal's possession and rights of trade in the Azores, Madeira, the Cape Verde Islands, and the coast of Guinea. It was further stipulated that any violation of the terms would incur a fine of 300,000 gold "doblas".

A collateral agreement, the "Tercerias de Moura" arranged the marriage of Afonso V's grandson Alfonso to Isabella of Castile's oldest daughter, also named Isabella. It provided that the children would live at Mouros, a town near the border between both kingdoms, under the supervision of Dona Beatrice, until they were old enough to wed.

The treaty also states that the parties took a solemn oath to abide by its terms, and pledged not to subsequently seek or avail themselves of a dispensation from the oath from the Pope or his representative.

On May 4, 1481, King Afonso V of Portugal granted his son, Infante Joao the trade and fisheries of Guinea, and prohibited anyone from going there without a license from the prince. By the end of August Prince John had succeeded his father as king. His main objective was to find a sea route to the East.

== Papal endorsement ==
The bull confirmed the earlier bulls Romanus Pontifex, issued by Nicholas V in 1455. It also incorporated the terms already agreed to by Portugal and Castile in the Treaty of Alcáçovas, lending moral authority to the parties' territorial division.

According to Malyn Newitt in A History of Portuguese Overseas Expansion, "Portuguese's ... empire was able to grow in a manner which would have been impossible if it had been challenged by a well-armed opponent." However, Isabella and Ferdinand were involved in the Granada War, England was embroiled in dynastic conflict, and Louis XI of France was drawn to the affairs of Italy.

== See also ==
- Catholic Church and the Age of Discovery
- Treaty of Tordesillas (1494)

== Sources ==
- Bown, Stephen R. (2012). 1494: How a Family Feud in Medieval Spain Divided the World in Half. St. Martin's Press. ISBN 978-0-312-61612-0.
- Davenport, Frances Gardiner (1917). European Treaties Bearing on the History of the United States and Its Dependencies. Carnegie Institution of Washington. ISBN 978-0-598-21641-0.
