= European colonization of the Americas =

15th–19th century colonization

During the Age of Discovery, a large scale colonization of the Americas, involving a number of European countries, took place primarily between the late 15th century and early 19th century. The Norse settled areas of the North Atlantic, colonizing Greenland and creating a short-term settlement near the northern tip of Newfoundland circa 1000 AD. However, due to its long duration and importance, the later colonization by Europeans, after Christopher Columbus's voyages, is better known. During this time, the European colonial empires of Spain, Portugal, Great Britain, France, Russia, the Netherlands, Denmark, and Sweden began to explore and claim the Americas, their natural resources, and human capital, leading to the displacement, disestablishment, enslavement, and genocide of the Indigenous peoples in the Americas, and the establishment of several settler colonial states.

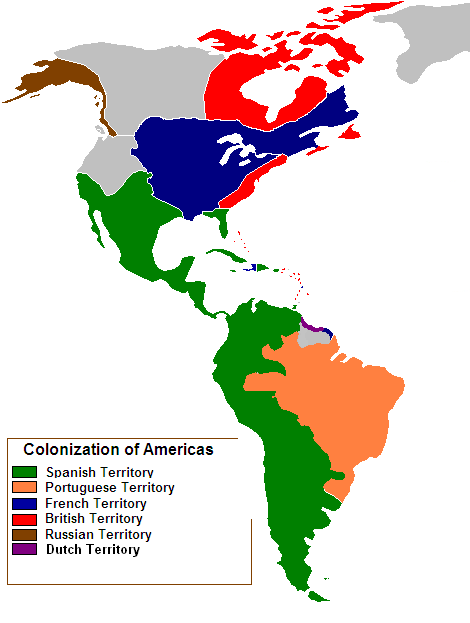
Territories in the Americas claimed by a European great power in 1750

The rapid rate at which some European nations grew in wealth and power was unforeseeable in the early 15th century because it had been preoccupied with internal wars and it was slowly recovering from the loss of population caused by the Black Death. The Ottoman Empire's domination of trade routes to Asia prompted Western European monarchs to search for alternatives, resulting in the voyages of Christopher Columbus and his accidental arrival at the New World. With the signing of the Treaty of Tordesillas in 1494, Portugal and Spain agreed to divide the Earth in two, with Portugal having dominion over non-Christian lands in the world's eastern half, and Spain over those in the western half. Spanish claims essentially included all of the Americas; however, the Treaty of Tordesillas granted the eastern tip of South America to Portugal, where it established Brazil in the early 1500s, and the East Indies to Spain, where It established the Philippines. The city of Santo Domingo, in the current-day Dominican Republic, founded in 1496 by Columbus, is credited as the oldest continuously inhabited European-established settlement in the Americas.

By the 1530s, other Western European powers realized they too could benefit from voyages to the Americas, leading to British and French colonization in the northeast tip of the Americas, including in the present-day United States. Within a century, the Swedish established New Sweden; the Dutch established New Netherland; and Denmark–Norway along with the Swedish and Dutch established colonization of parts of the Caribbean. By the 1700s, Denmark–Norway revived Norway's former colonies in Greenland, and Russia began to explore and claim the Pacific Coast from Alaska to California. Many of the social structures—including religions, political boundaries, and linguae francae—which predominate in the Western Hemisphere in the 21st century are the descendants of those that were established during this period.

Violent conflicts arose during the beginning of this period as indigenous peoples fought to preserve their territorial integrity from increasing European settlers and from hostile indigenous neighbors who were equipped with European technology. Conflict between the various European colonial empires and the American Indian tribes was a leading dynamic in the Americas into the 1800s, although some parts of the continent gained their independence from Europe by then, countries such as the United States continued to fight against Indian tribes and practiced settler colonialism. The United States for example practiced a settler colonial policy of Manifest destiny and Indian removal. Other regions, including California, Patagonia, the North-Western Territory, and the northern Great Plains, experienced little to no colonization at all until the 1800s. European contact and colonization had disastrous effects on the indigenous peoples of the Americas and their societies.

== Western European powers ==
=== Vikings ===
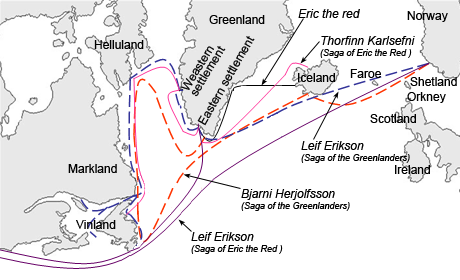
Various sailing routes to Greenland, Vinland (Newfoundland), Helluland (Baffin Island), and Markland (Labrador) travelled by the Icelandic Sagas, including in the Saga of Erik the Red and Saga of the Greenlanders

Norse Viking explorers were the first known Europeans to set foot in North America. Norse journeys to Greenland and Canada are supported by historical and archaeological evidence. The Norsemen established a colony in Greenland in the late tenth century, which lasted until the mid 15th-century, with court and parliament assemblies (þing) taking place at Brattahlíð and a bishop located at Garðar. The remains of a settlement at L'Anse aux Meadows in Newfoundland, Canada, were discovered in 1960 and were dated to around the year 1000 (carbon dating estimate 990–1050). L'Anse aux Meadows is the only site widely accepted as evidence of pre-Columbian trans-oceanic contact. It was named a World Heritage Site by UNESCO in 1978. It is also notable for its possible connection with the attempted colony of Vinland, established by Leif Erikson around the same period or, more broadly, with the Norse colonization of the Americas. Leif Erikson's brother is said to have had the first contact with the native population of North America which would come to be known as the skrælings. After capturing and killing eight of the natives, they were attacked at their beached ships, which they defended.

=== Spain ===
Christopher Columbus voyages

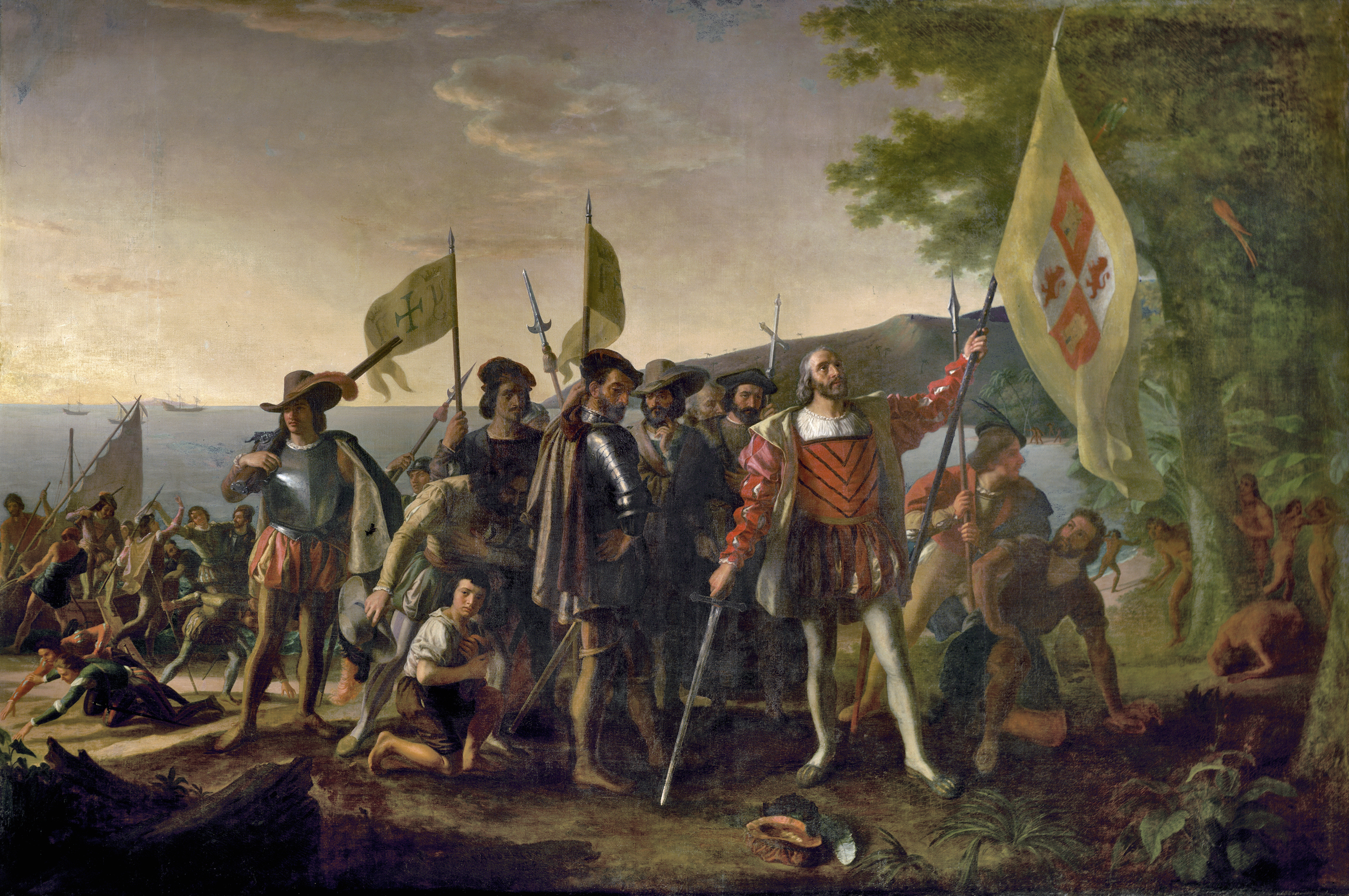
Christopher Columbus and his crew are landing in the West Indies, on an island named San Salvador, on October 12, 1492.

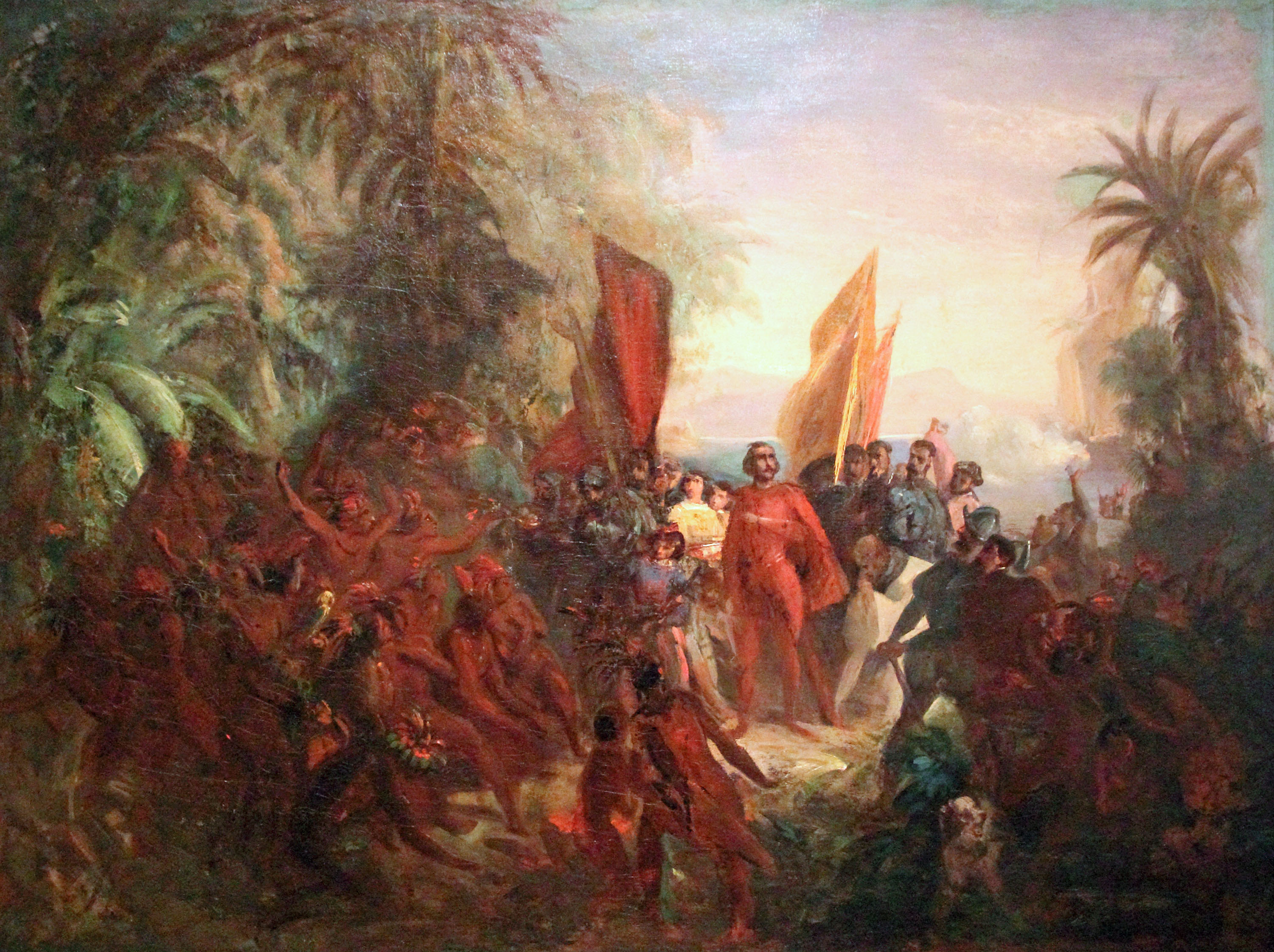
The Discovery of America (Johann Moritz Rugendas)

Amerigo Vespucci wakes up "America" in Americae Retectio, engraving by the Flemish artist Jan Galle (circa 1615).

The systematic and long-term European colonization began in 1492 with Spain. A Spanish expedition sailed west to find a new trade route to the Orient, the source of spices, silks, porcelains, and other rich trade goods. Ottoman control of the Silk Road, the traditional route for trade between Europe and Asia, forced European traders to look for alternative routes. The Genoese mariner Christopher Columbus led an expedition to find a route to East Asia, but instead landed in The Bahamas. Columbus encountered the Lucayan people on the island Guanahani (possibly Cat Island), which they had inhabited since the ninth century. In his reports, Columbus exaggerated the quantity of gold in the East Indies, which he called the "New World". These claims, along with the slaves he brought back, convinced the monarchy to fund a second voyage. Word of Columbus's exploits spread quickly, sparking the Western European exploration, conquest, and colonization of the Americas.

Ferdinand Magellan and other explorers of the Pacific

Spanish explorers, conquerors, and settlers sought material wealth, prestige, and the spread of Christianity, often summed up in the phrase "gold, glory, and God". The Spanish justified their claims to the New World based on the ideals of the Christian Reconquista of the Iberian Peninsula from the Muslims, completed in 1492. In the New World, military conquest to incorporate indigenous peoples into Christendom was considered the "spiritual conquest". In 1493, Pope Alexander VI, the first Spaniard to become Pope, issued a series of Papal Bulls that confirmed Spanish claims to the newly discovered lands.

After the final Reconquista of Iberia, the Treaty of Tordesillas was ratified by the Pope, the two kingdoms of Castile (in a personal union with other kingdoms of Spain) and Portugal in 1494. The treaty divided the entire non-European world into two spheres of exploration and colonization. The longitudinal boundary cut through the Atlantic Ocean and the eastern part of present-day Brazil. The countries declared their rights to the land despite the fact that Indigenous populations had settled from pole to pole in the hemisphere and it was their homeland.

After European contact, the native population of the Americas plummeted by an estimated 80% (from around 50 million in 1492 to eight million in 1650), due in part to Old World diseases carried to the New World. Smallpox was especially devastating, for it could be passed through touch, allowing native tribes to be wiped out, and the conditions that colonization imposed on Indigenous populations, such as forced labor and removal from homelands and traditional medicines. Some scholars have argued that this demographic collapse was the result of the first large-scale act of genocide in the modern era.

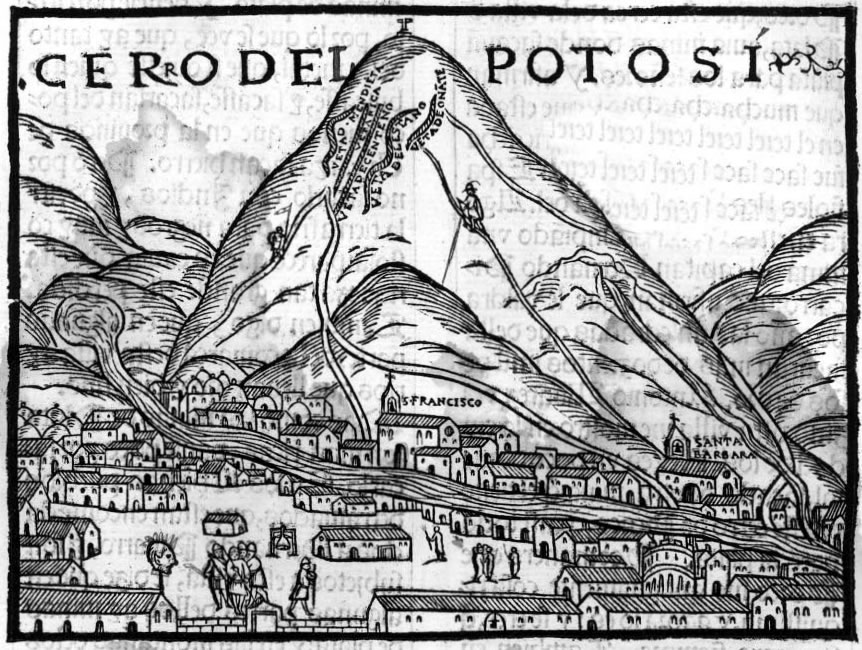
The silver mountain of Potosí, in what is now Bolivia. It was the source of vast amounts of silver that transformed the world economy.

For example, the labor and tribute of inhabitants of Hispaniola were granted in encomienda to Spaniards, a practice established in Spain for conquered Muslims. Although not technically slavery, it was coerced labor for the benefit of the Spanish grantees, called encomenderos. Spain had a legal tradition and devised a proclamation known as The Requerimento to be read to indigenous populations in Spanish, often far from the field of battle, stating that the indigenous were now subjects of the Spanish Crown and would be punished if they resisted. When the news of this situation and the abuse of the institution reached Spain, the New Laws were passed to regulate and gradually abolish the system in the Americas, as well as to reiterate the prohibition of enslaving Native Americans. By the time the new laws were passed, in 1542, the Spanish crown had acknowledged their inability to control and properly ensure compliance with traditional laws overseas, so they granted to Native Americans specific protections not even Spaniards had, such as the prohibition of enslaving them even in the case of crime or war. These extra protections were an attempt to avoid the proliferation of irregular claims to slavery. However, as historian Andrés Reséndez has noted, "this categorical prohibition did not stop generations of determined conquistadors and colonists from taking Native slaves on a planetary scale, ... The fact that this other slavery had to be carried out clandestinely made it even more insidious. It is a tale of good intentions gone badly astray."

A major event in early Spanish colonization, which had so far yielded paltry returns, was the Spanish conquest of the Aztec Empire (1519–1521). It was led by Hernán Cortés and made possible by securing indigenous alliances with the Aztecs' enemies, mobilizing thousands of warriors against the Aztecs for their own political reasons. The Aztec capital, Tenochtitlan, became Mexico City, the chief city of the "New Spain". More than an estimated 240,000 Aztecs died during the siege of Tenochtitlan, 100,000 in combat, while 500–1,000 of the Spaniards engaged in the conquest died. The other great conquest was of the Inca Empire (1531–35), led by Francisco Pizarro.

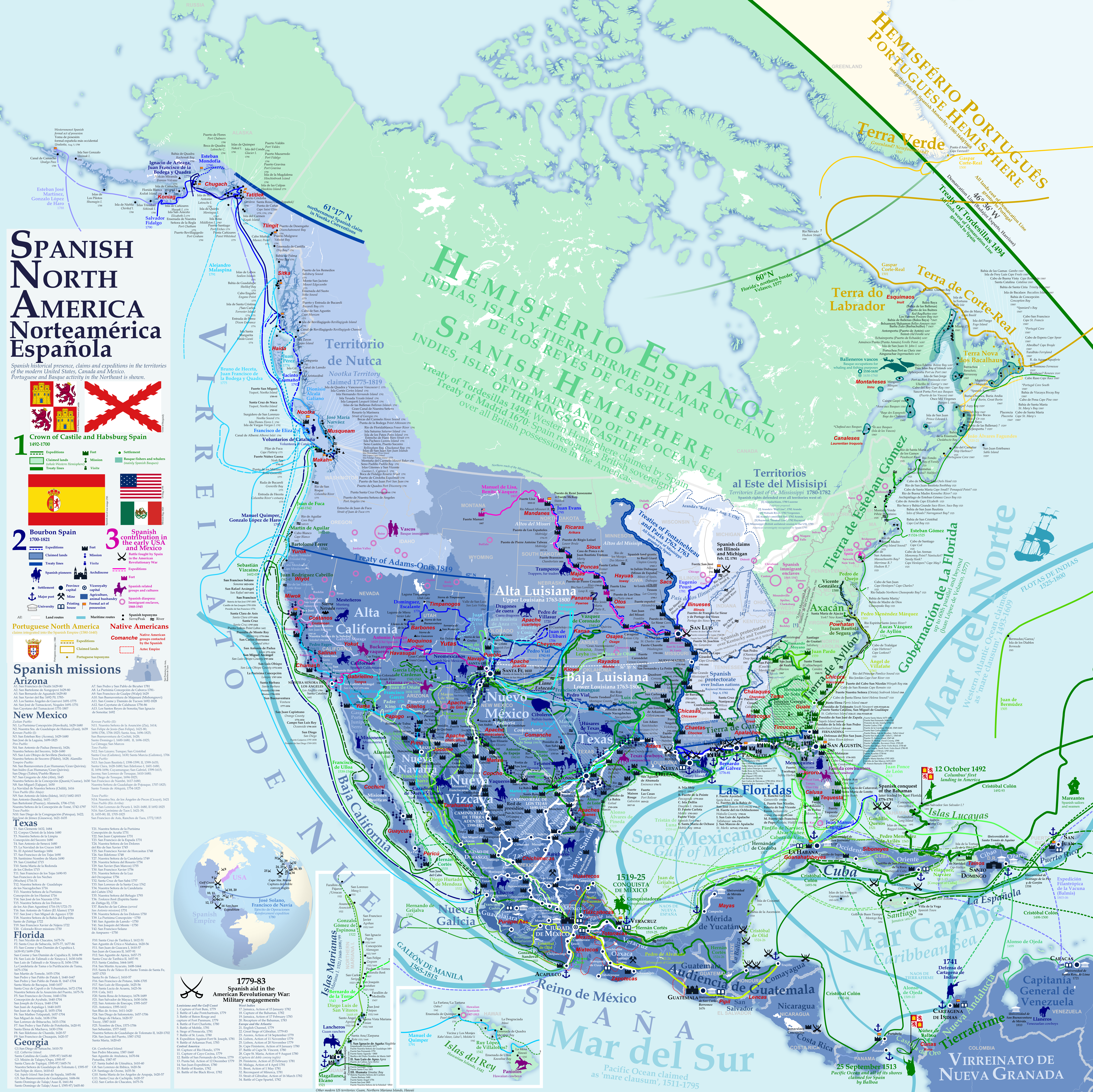
Spanish historical and territorial presence in North America

During the early period of exploration, conquest, and settlement, c. 1492–1550, the overseas possessions claimed by Spain were only loosely controlled by the crown. With the conquests of the Aztecs and the Incas, the New World now commanded the crown's attention. Both Mexico and Peru had dense, hierarchically organized indigenous populations that could be incorporated and ruled. Even more importantly, both Mexico and Peru had large deposits of silver, which became the economic motor of the Spanish empire and transformed the world economy. In Peru, the singular, hugely rich silver mine of Potosí was worked by traditional forced indigenous labor drafts, known as the mit'a. In Mexico, silver was found outside the zone of dense indigenous settlement, so laborers migrated to the mines in Guanajuato and Zacatecas. The crown established the Council of the Indies in 1524, based in Seville, and issued laws of the Indies to assert its power against the early conquerors. The crown created the viceroyalty of New Spain and the viceroyalty of Peru to tighten crown control over these rich prizes of conquest.

=== Portugal ===
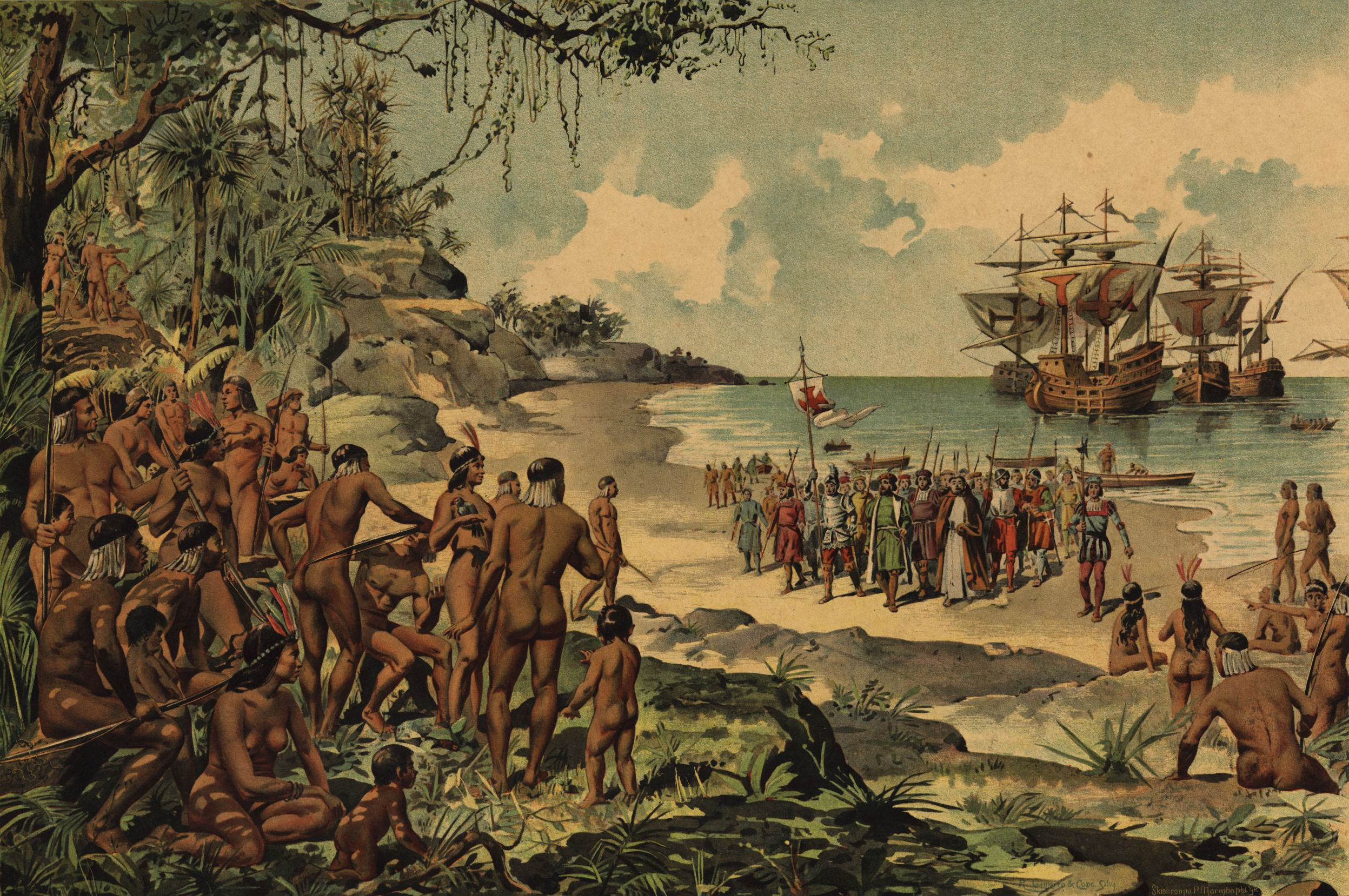
Discovery of Brazil

Over this same time frame as Spain, Portugal claimed lands in North America (Canada) and colonized much of eastern South America naming it Santa Cruz and Brazil. On behalf of both the Portuguese and Spanish crowns, cartographer Amerigo Vespucci explored the South American east coast and published his new book Mundus Novus (New World) in 1502–1503 which disproved the belief that the Americas were the easternmost part of Asia and confirmed that Columbus had reached a set of continents previously unheard of to any Europeans. Cartographers still use a Latinized version of his first name, America, for the two continents. In April 1500, Portuguese noble Pedro Álvares Cabral claimed the region of Brazil to Portugal; the effective colonization of Brazil began three decades later with the founding of São Vicente in 1532 and the establishment of the system of captaincies in 1534, which was later replaced by other systems. Others tried to colonize the eastern coasts of present-day Canada and the River Plate in South America. These explorers include João Vaz Corte-Real in Newfoundland; João Fernandes Lavrador, Gaspar and Miguel Corte-Real and João Álvares Fagundes, in Newfoundland, Greenland, Labrador, and Nova Scotia (from 1498 to 1502, and in 1520).

During this time, the Portuguese gradually switched from an initial plan of establishing trading posts to extensive colonization of what is now Brazil. They imported millions of slaves to run their plantations. The Portuguese and Spanish royal governments expected to rule these settlements and collect at least 20% of all treasure found (the quinto real collected by the Casa de Contratación), in addition to collecting all the taxes they could. By the late 16th century silver from the Americas accounted for one-fifth of the combined total budget of Portugal and Spain. In the 16th century perhaps 240,000 Europeans entered ports in the Americas.

=== France ===
Map of territorial claims in North America by 1750, before the French and Indian War, which was part of the greater worldwide conflict known as the Seven Years' War (1756 to 1763). Possessions of Britain (pink), France (blue), and Spain. White border lines mark later Canadian Provinces and US States for reference.

France founded colonies in the Americas: in eastern North America (which had not been colonized by Spain north of Florida), a number of Caribbean islands (which had often already been conquered by the Spanish or depopulated by disease), and small coastal parts of South America. Explorers included Giovanni da Verrazzano in 1524; Jacques Cartier (1491–1557), and Samuel de Champlain (1567–1635), who explored the region of Canada he reestablished as New France.

The first French colonial empire stretched to over 10,000,000 km^{2} (3,900,000 sq mi) at its peak in 1710, which was the second largest colonial empire in the world, after the Spanish Empire.

In the French colonial regions, the focus of the economy was on sugar plantations in the French West Indies. In Canada the fur trade with the natives was important. About 16,000 French men and women became colonizers. The great majority became subsistence farmers along the St. Lawrence River. With a favorable disease environment and plenty of land and food, their numbers grew exponentially to 65,000 by 1760. Their colony was taken over by Britain in 1760, but social, religious, legal, cultural, and economic changes were few in a society that clung tightly to its recently formed traditions.

=== British ===
British colonization began in North America almost a century after Spain. The relatively late arrival meant that the British could use the other European colonization powers as models for their endeavors. Inspired by the Spanish riches from colonies founded upon the conquest of the Aztecs, Incas, and other large Native American populations in the 16th century, their first attempt at colonization occurred in Roanoke and Newfoundland, although unsuccessful. In 1606, King James I granted a charter with the purpose of discovering the riches at their first permanent settlement in Jamestown, Virginia in 1607. They were sponsored by common stock companies such as the chartered Virginia Company financed by wealthy Englishmen who exaggerated the economic potential of the land.

The English Reformation led to the formation of numerous new Protestant sects, which often faced persecution by governmental authorities. In England, many people came to question the organization of the Church of England by the end of the 16th century. One of the primary manifestations of this was the Puritan movement, which sought to purify the existing Church of England of its residual Catholic rites. The first of these people, known as the Pilgrims, landed on Plymouth Rock in November 1620. Continuous waves of repression led to the migration of about 20,000 Puritans to New England between 1629 and 1642, where they founded multiple colonies. Later in the century, the new Province of Pennsylvania was given to William Penn in settlement of a debt the king owed his father. Its government was established by William Penn in about 1682 to become primarily a refuge for persecuted English Quakers, but others were welcomed. Baptists, German and Swiss Protestants, and Anabaptists also flocked to Pennsylvania. The lure of cheap land, religious freedom and the right to improve themselves with their own hand was very attractive. The English eventually went on to control much of Eastern North America, the Caribbean, and parts of South America. They also gained Florida and Quebec in the French and Indian War.

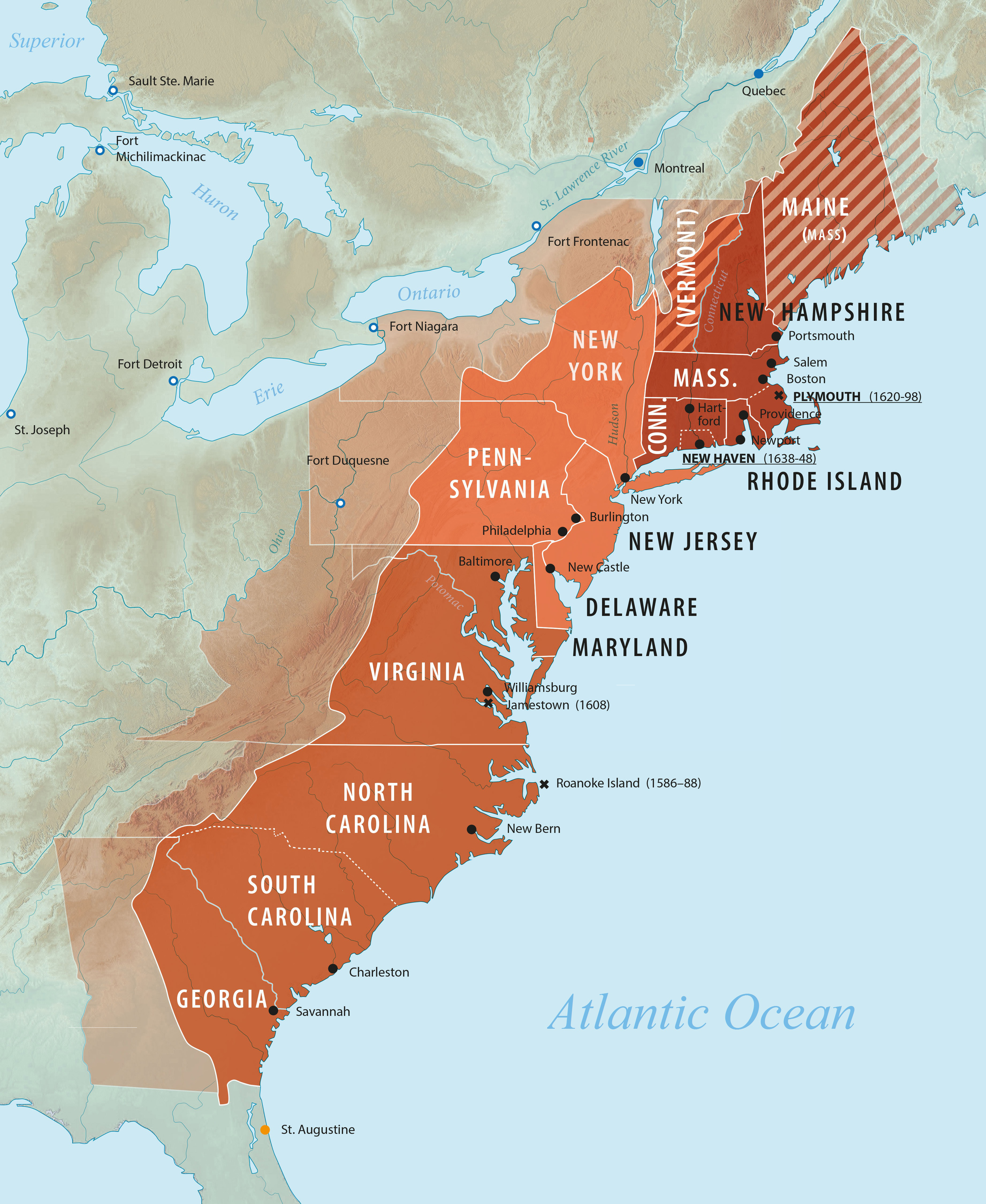
Thirteen Colonies of North America: Dark Red = New England colonies. Bright Red = Middle Atlantic colonies. Red-brown = Southern colonies.

There was a sharp separation between English colonial communities and indigenous communities. The Europeans viewed the natives as savages who were not worthy of participating in what they considered civilized society. The native people of North America did not die out nearly as rapidly nor as greatly as those in Central and South America due in part to their exclusion from British society. The indigenous people continued to be stripped of their native lands and were pushed further west.

John Smith convinced the colonists of Jamestown that searching for gold was not taking care of their immediate needs for food and shelter. The lack of food security leading to an extremely high mortality rate was quite distressing and cause for despair among the colonists. To support the colony, numerous supply missions were organized. Tobacco soon became a highly profitable cash crop, with the work of John Rolfe and others, for export and the sustaining economic driver of Virginia and the neighboring colony of Maryland. Plantation agriculture was a primary aspect of the economies of the Southern Colonies. In the British West Indies plantations heavily relied on African slave labor to operate.

From the beginning of Virginia's settlements in 1587 until the 1680s, the main source of labor and a large portion of the immigrants were indentured servants looking for a new life in the overseas colonies. During the 17th century, indentured servants constituted three-quarters of all European immigrants to the Chesapeake Colonies. Most of the indentured servants were teenagers from England with poor economic prospects at home. Their fathers signed the papers that gave them free passage to America and an unpaid job until they came of age. They were given food, clothing, and housing and taught farming or household skills. American landowners were in need of laborers and were willing to pay for a laborer's passage to America if they served them for several years. By selling passage for five to seven years worth of work, they could then start on their own in America. Many of the migrants from England died in the first few years.

Economic advantage also prompted the Darien scheme, an ill-fated venture by the Kingdom of Scotland to settle the Isthmus of Panama in the late 1690s. The Darien Scheme aimed to control trade through that part of the world and thereby promote Scotland into a world trading power. However, it was doomed by poor planning, short provisions, weak leadership, lack of demand for trade goods, and devastating disease. The failure of the Darien scheme was one of the factors that led the Kingdom of Scotland into the Act of Union 1707 with the Kingdom of England, creating the united Kingdom of Great Britain and giving Scotland commercial access to English, now British, colonies.

=== Dutch ===
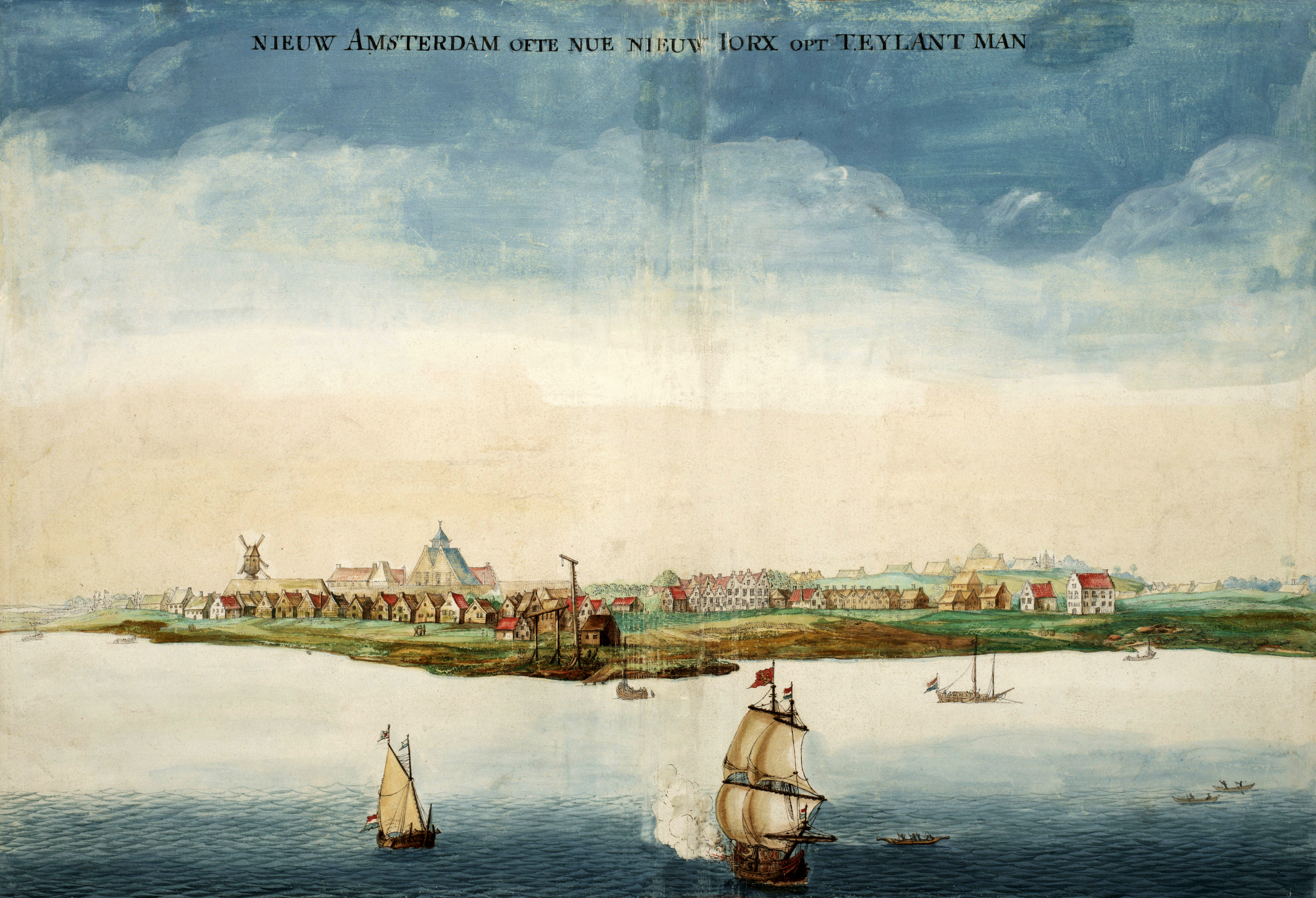
New Amsterdam on lower Manhattan island, was captured by the English in 1665, becoming New York.

The Netherlands had been part of the Spanish Empire, due to the inheritance of Charles V of Spain. Many Dutch people converted to Protestantism and sought their political independence from Spain. They were a seafaring nation and built a global empire in regions where the Portuguese had originally explored. In the Dutch Golden Age, it sought colonies. In the Americas, the Dutch conquered the northeast of Brazil in 1630, where the Portuguese had built sugar cane plantations worked by black slave labor from Africa. Prince Johan Maurits van Nassau-Siegen became the administrator of the colony (1637–43), building a capital city and royal palace, fully expecting the Dutch to retain control of this rich area. As the Dutch had in Europe, it tolerated the presence of Jews and other religious groups in the colony. After Maurits departed in 1643, the Dutch West India Company took over the colony until it was lost to the Portuguese in 1654. The Dutch retained some territory in Dutch Guiana, now Suriname. The Dutch also seized islands in the Caribbean that Spain had originally claimed but had largely abandoned, including Sint Maarten in 1618, Bonaire in 1634, Curaçao in 1634, Sint Eustatius in 1636, Aruba in 1637, some of which remain in Dutch hands and retain Dutch cultural traditions.

On the east coast of North America, the Dutch planted the colony of New Netherland on the lower end of the island of Manhattan, at New Amsterdam starting in 1624. The Dutch sought to protect their investments and purchased Manhattan from a band of Canarse from Brooklyn who occupied the bottom quarter of Manhattan, known then as the Manhattoes, for 60 guilders' worth of trade goods. Minuit conducted the transaction with the Canarse chief Seyseys, who accepted valuable merchandise in exchange for an island that was actually mostly controlled by another indigenous group, the Weckquaesgeeks. Dutch fur traders set up a network upstream on the Hudson River. There were Jewish settlers from 1654 onward, and they remained following the English capture of New Amsterdam in 1664. The naval capture was despite both nations being at peace with the other.

=== Russia ===
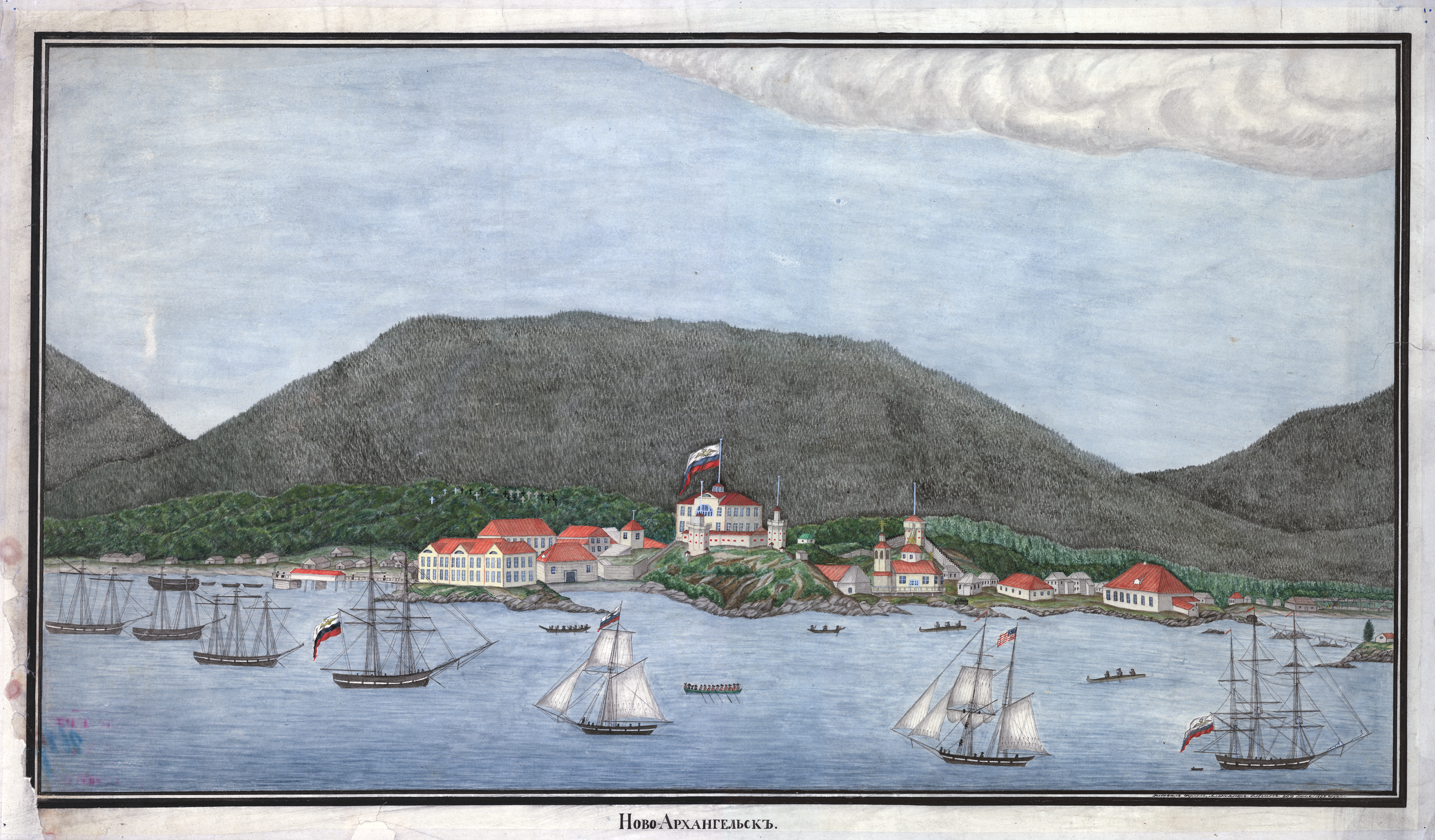
New Archangel (present-day Sitka, Alaska), the capital of Russian America, in 1837

Russia came to colonization late compared to Spain or Portugal, or even England. Siberia was added to the Russian Empire and Cossack explorers along rivers sought valuable furs of ermine, sable, and fox. Cossacks enlisted the aid of indigenous Siberians, who sought protection from nomadic peoples, and those peoples paid tribute in fur to the czar. Thus, prior to the eighteenth-century Russian expansion that pushed beyond the Bering Strait dividing Eurasia from North America, Russia had experience with northern indigenous peoples and accumulated wealth from the hunting of fur-bearing animals. Siberia had already attracted a core group of scientists, who sought to map and catalogue the flora, fauna, and other aspects of the natural world.

A major Russian expedition for exploration was mounted in 1742, contemporaneous with other eighteenth-century European state-sponsored ventures. It was not clear at the time whether Eurasia and North America were completely separate continents. The first voyages were made by Vitus Bering and Aleksei Chirikov, with settlement beginning after 1743. By the 1790s the first permanent settlements were established. Explorations continued down the Pacific coast of North America, and Russia established a settlement in the early nineteenth century at what is now called Fort Ross, California. Russian fur traders forced indigenous Aleut men into seasonal labor. Never very profitable, Russia sold its North American holdings to the United States in 1867, called at the time "Seward's Folly".

== Religion and colonization ==
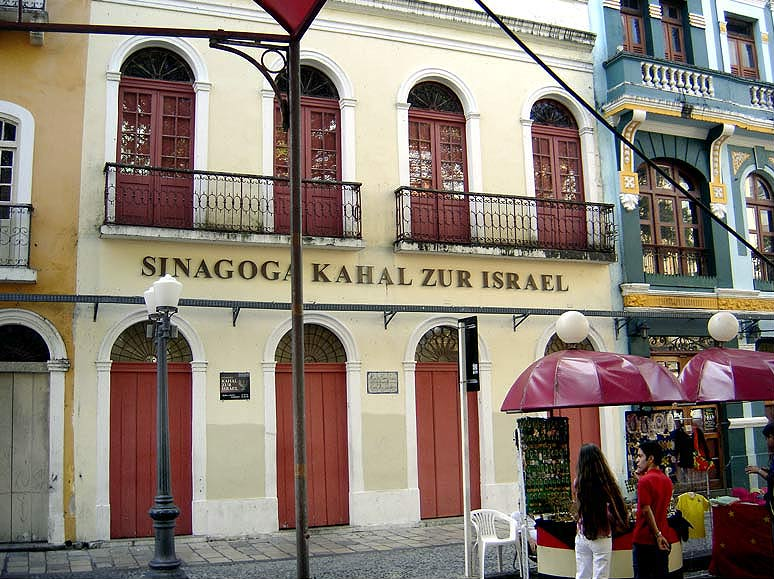
The Kahal Zur Israel Synagogue in Mauritsstad (Recife) is the oldest synagogue in the Americas. An estimated number of 700 Jews lived in Dutch Brazil, about 4.7% of the total population.

Roman Catholics were the first major religious group to immigrate to the New World, as settlers in the Spanish and Portuguese colonies of Portugal and Spain, and later, France in New France. No other religion was tolerated and there was a concerted effort to convert indigenous peoples and black slaves to Catholicism. The Catholic Church established three offices of the Spanish Inquisition, in Mexico City; Lima, Peru; and Cartagena de Indias in Colombia to maintain religious orthodoxy and practice. The Portuguese did not establish a permanent office of the Portuguese Inquisition in Brazil, but did send visitations of inquisitors in the seventeenth century.

English and Dutch colonies, on the other hand, tended to be more religiously diverse. Settlers to these colonies included Anglicans, Dutch Calvinists, English Puritans and other nonconformists, English Catholics, Scottish Presbyterians, French Protestant Huguenots, German and Swedish Lutherans, as well as Jews, Quakers, Mennonites, Amish, and Moravians. Jews fled to the Dutch colony of New Amsterdam when the Spanish and Portuguese inquisitions cracked down on their presence.

=== Christianization ===
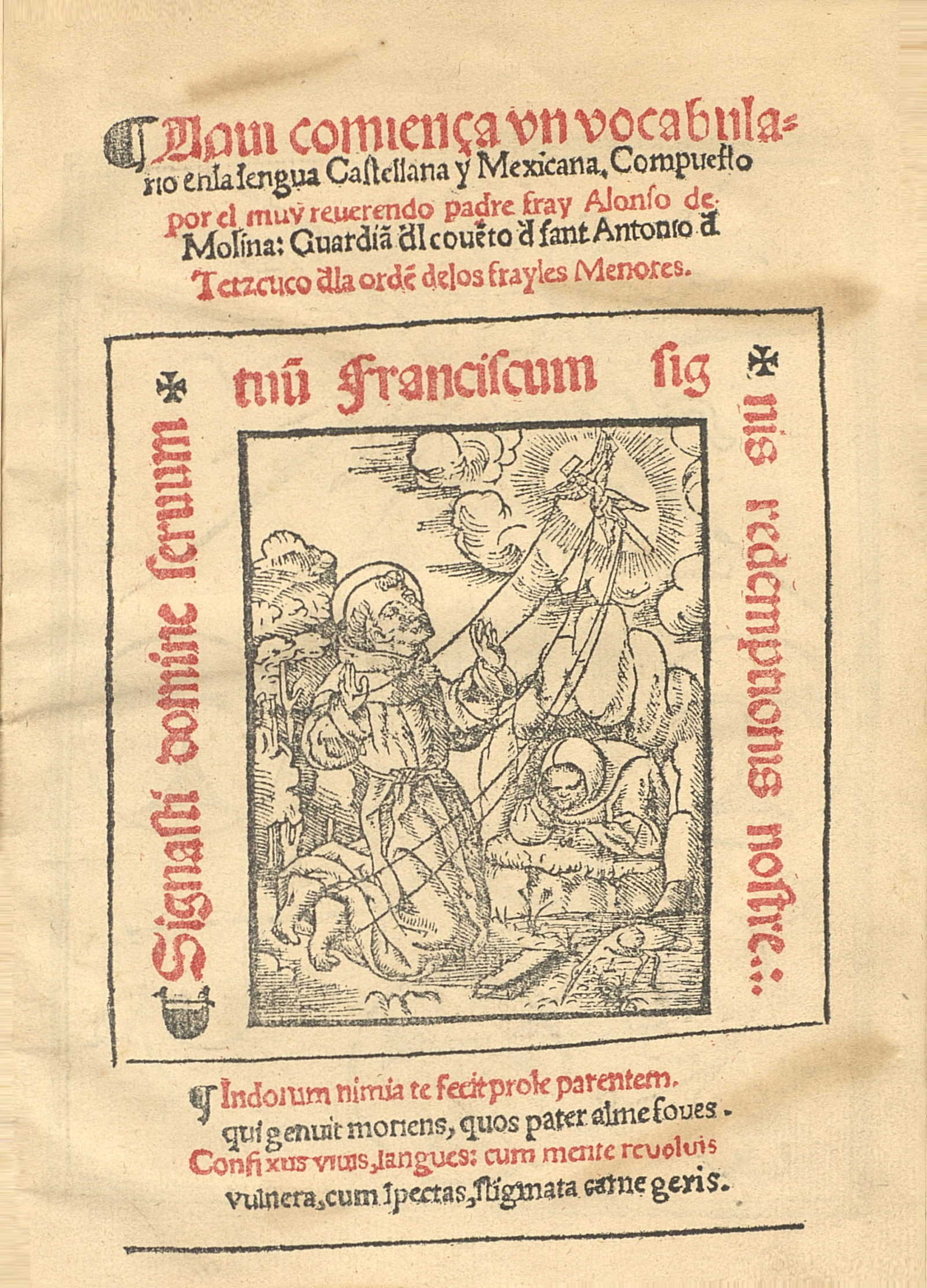
Franciscan Alonso de Molina's 1565 Nahuatl (Aztec) dictionary, conceived for friars to communicate with the indigenous peoples in central Mexico in their own language

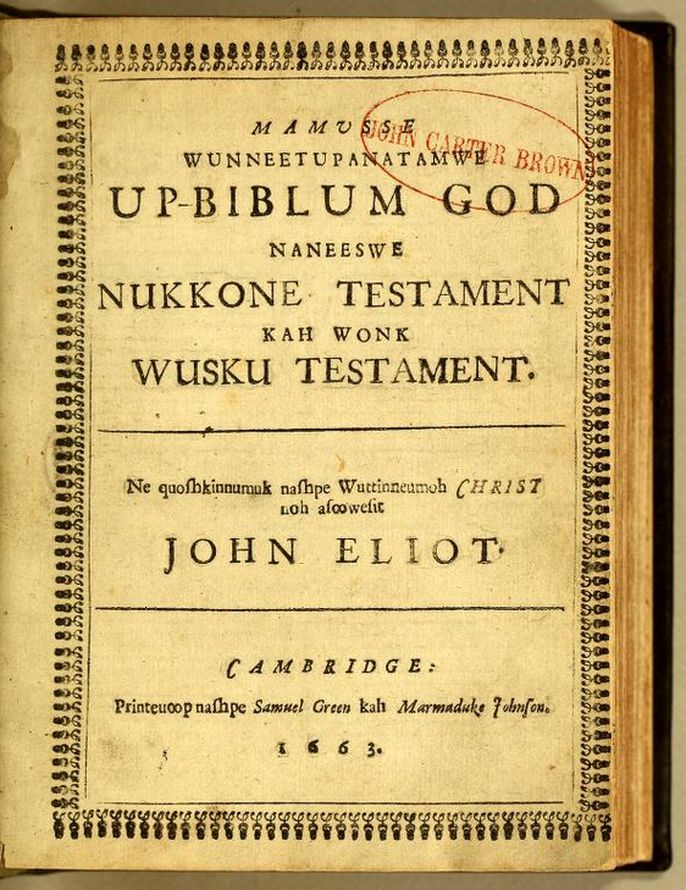
Eliot Indian Bible

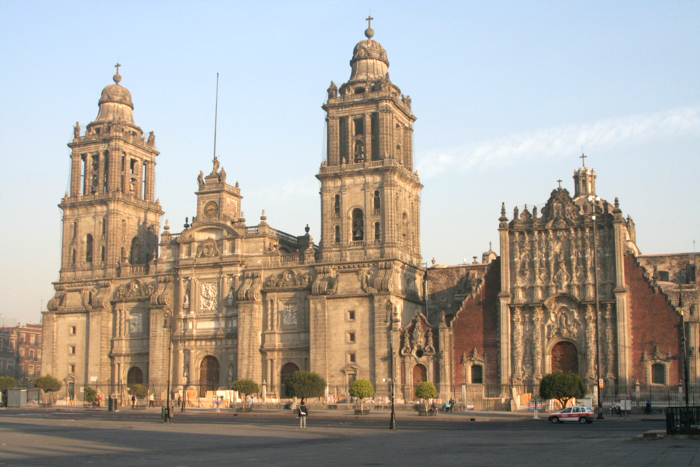
Catholic cathedral in Mexico City

Beginning with the first wave of European colonization, the religious discrimination, persecution, and violence toward the Indigenous peoples' native religions was systematically perpetrated by the European Christian colonists and settlers from the 15th–16th centuries onwards.

During the Age of Discovery and the following centuries, the Spanish and Portuguese colonial empires were the most active in attempting to convert the Indigenous peoples of the Americas to the Christian religion. Pope Alexander VI issued the Inter caetera bull in May 1493 that confirmed the lands claimed by the Kingdom of Spain, and mandated in exchange that the Indigenous peoples be converted to Catholic Christianity. During Columbus's second voyage, Benedictine friars accompanied him, along with twelve other priests. With the Spanish conquest of the Aztec empire, evangelization of the dense Indigenous populations was undertaken in what was called the "spiritual conquest". Several mendicant orders were involved in the early campaign to convert the Indigenous peoples. Franciscans and Dominicans learned Indigenous languages of the Americas, such as Nahuatl, Mixtec, and Zapotec. One of the first schools for Indigenous peoples in Mexico was founded by Pedro de Gante in 1523. The friars aimed at converting Indigenous leaders, with the hope and expectation that their communities would follow suit. In densely populated regions, friars mobilized Indigenous communities to build churches, making the religious change visible; these churches and chapels were often in the same places as old temples, often using the same stones. "Native peoples exhibited a range of responses, from outright hostility to active embrace of the new religion." In central and southern Mexico where there was an existing Indigenous tradition of creating written texts, the friars taught Indigenous scribes to write their own languages in Latin letters. There is a significant body of texts in Indigenous languages created by and for Indigenous peoples in their own communities for their own purposes. In frontier areas where there were no settled Indigenous populations, friars and Jesuits often created missions, bringing together dispersed Indigenous populations in communities supervised by the friars in order to more easily preach the gospel and ensure their adherence to the faith. These missions were established throughout Spanish America which extended from the southwestern portions of current-day United States through Mexico and to Argentina and Chile.

As slavery was prohibited between Christians and could only be imposed upon non-Christian prisoners of war and/or men already sold as slaves, the debate on Christianization was particularly acute during the early 16th century, when Spanish conquerors and settlers sought to mobilize Indigenous labor. Later, two Dominican friars, Bartolomé de Las Casas and the philosopher Juan Ginés de Sepúlveda, held the Valladolid debate, with the former arguing that Native Americans were endowed with souls like all other human beings, while the latter argued to the contrary to justify their enslavement. In 1537, the papal bull Sublimis Deus definitively recognized that Native Americans possessed souls, thus prohibiting their enslavement, without putting an end to the debate. Some claimed that a native who had rebelled and then been captured could be enslaved nonetheless.

When the first Franciscans arrived in Mexico in 1524, they burned the sacred places dedicated to the Indigenous peoples' native religions. However, in Pre-Columbian Mexico, burning the temple of a conquered group was standard practice, shown in Indigenous manuscripts, such as Codex Mendoza. Conquered Indigenous groups expected to take on the gods of their new overlords, adding them to the existing pantheon. They likely were unaware that their conversion to Christianity entailed the complete and irrevocable renunciation of their ancestral religious beliefs and practices. In 1539, Mexican bishop Juan de Zumárraga oversaw the trial and execution of the Indigenous nobleman Carlos of Texcoco for apostasy from Christianity. Following that, the Catholic Church removed Indigenous converts from the jurisdiction of the Inquisition, since it had a chilling effect on evangelization. In creating a protected group of Christians, Indigenous men no longer could aspire to be ordained Christian priests.

Throughout the Americas, the Jesuits were active in attempting to convert the Indigenous peoples to Christianity. They had considerable success on the frontiers in New France and Portuguese Brazil, most famously with Antonio de Vieira, S.J; and in Paraguay, almost an autonomous state within a state. The Mamusse Wunneetupanatamwe Up-Biblum God, a translation by John Eliot of the gospel into Algonquian, was published in 1663.

== Disease, genocides, and indigenous population loss ==
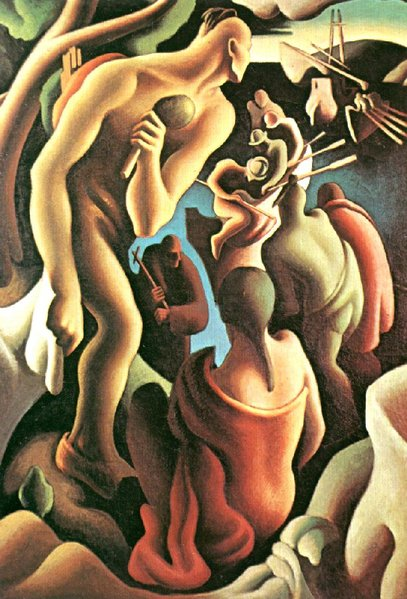
American Discovery Viewed by Native Americans, a 1922 painting by Thomas Hart Benton, now housed in the Peabody Essex Museum in Salem, Massachusetts, United States

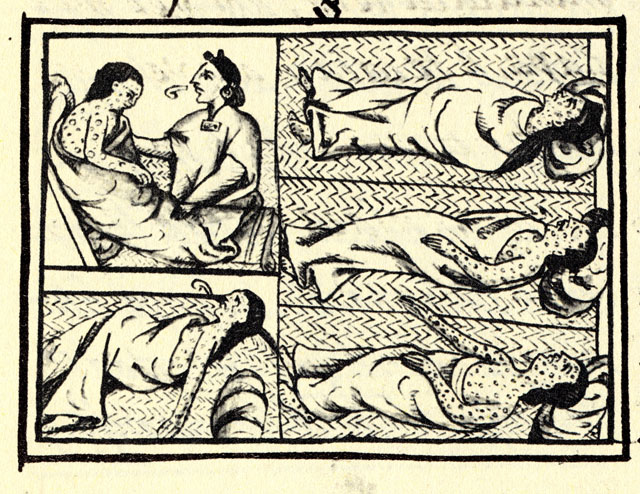
Drawing accompanying text in Book XII of the 16th-century Florentine Codex (compiled 1540–1585) Nahua suffering from smallpox

The European lifestyle included a long history of sharing close quarters with domesticated animals such as cows, pigs, sheep, goats, horses, dogs and various domesticated fowl, from which many diseases originally stemmed. In contrast to the indigenous people, the Europeans had developed a richer endowment of antibodies. The large-scale contact with Europeans after 1492 introduced Eurasian germs to the indigenous people of the Americas.

Epidemics of smallpox (1518, 1521, 1525, 1558, 1589), typhus (1546), influenza (1558), diphtheria (1614) and measles (1618) swept the Americas subsequent to European contact, killing between 10 million and 100 million people, up to 95% of the indigenous population of the Americas. The cultural and political instability attending these losses appears to have been of substantial aid in the efforts of various colonists in New England and Massachusetts to acquire control over the great wealth in land and resources of which indigenous societies had customarily made use.

Such diseases yielded human mortality of unquestionably enormous gravity and scale – and this has profoundly confused efforts to determine its full extent with any true precision. Estimates of the pre-Columbian population of the Americas vary tremendously. Others have argued that significant variations in population size over pre-Columbian history are reason to view higher-end estimates with caution. Such estimates may reflect historical population maxima, while indigenous populations may have been at a level somewhat below these maxima or in a moment of decline in the period just prior to contact with Europeans. Indigenous populations hit their ultimate lows in most areas of the Americas in the early 20th century; in a number of cases, growth has returned.

According to scientists from University College London, the colonization of the Americas by Europeans killed so much of the indigenous population that it resulted in climate change and global cooling. Some contemporary scholars also attribute significant indigenous population losses in the Caribbean to the widespread practice of slavery and deadly forced labor in gold and silver mines. Historian Andrés Reséndez, supports this claim and argues that indigenous populations were smaller previous estimations and "a nexus of slavery, overwork and famine killed more Indians in the Caribbean than smallpox, influenza and malaria."

According to the Cambridge World History, the Oxford Handbook of Genocide Studies, and the Cambridge World History of Genocide, colonial policies in some cases included the deliberate genocide of indigenous peoples in North America. According to the Cambridge World History of Genocide, Spanish colonization of the Americas also included genocidal massacres.

According to Adam Jones, genocidal methods included the following:

- Genocidal massacres
- Biological warfare, using pathogens (especially smallpox and plague) to which the indigenous peoples had no resistance
- Spreading of disease via the 'reduction' of Indians to densely crowded and unhygienic settlements
- Slavery and forced/indentured labor, especially, though not exclusively, in Latin America, in conditions often rivalling those of Nazi concentration camps
- Mass population removals to barren 'reservations,' sometimes involving death marches en route, and generally leading to widespread mortality and population collapse upon arrival
- Deliberate starvation and famine, exacerbated by destruction and occupation of the native land base and food resources
- Forced education of indigenous children in White-run schools ...

== Slavery ==
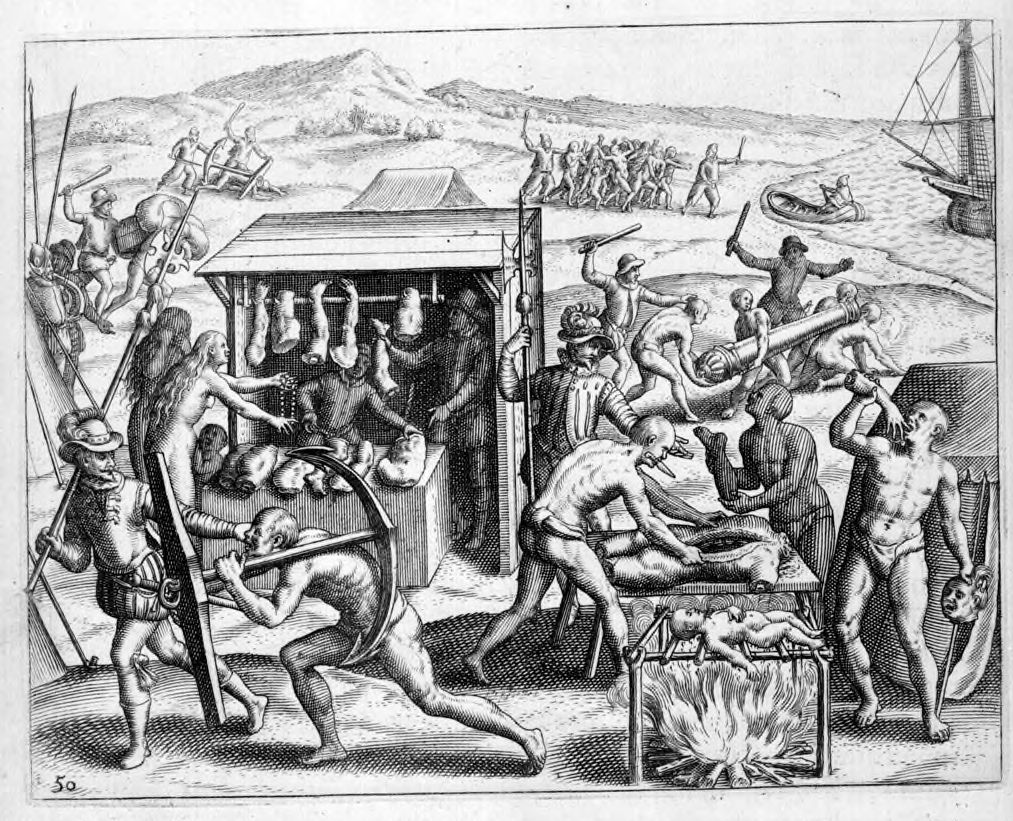
Depiction of Spanish treatment of the indigenous populations in the Caribbean by Theodore de Bry, illustrating Spanish Dominican friar Bartolomé de Las Casas's indictment of early Spanish cruelty, known as the Black legend, and indigenous barbarity, including human cannibalism, in an attempt to justify their enslavement

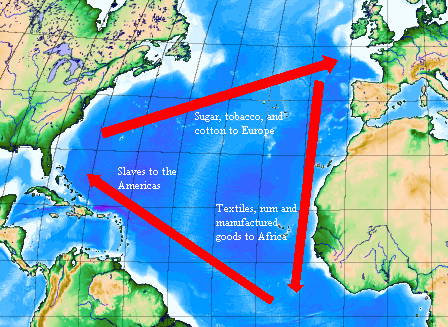
Triangular trade between Europe, Africa, and the Americas

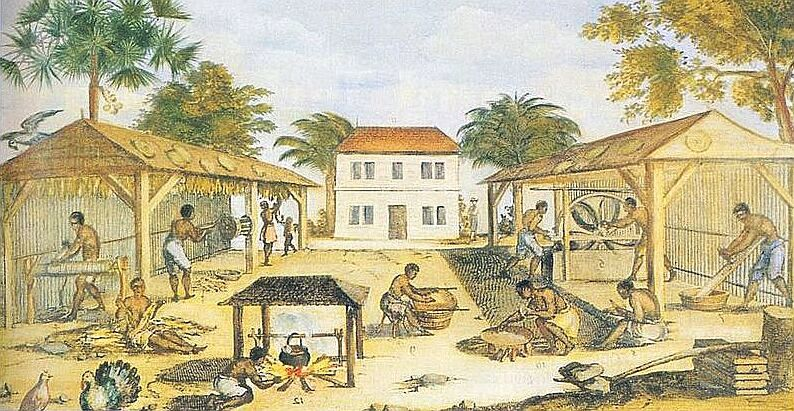
African slaves 17th-century in a tobacco plantation, Virginia, 1670

Indigenous population loss following European contact directly led to Spanish explorations beyond the Caribbean islands they initially claimed and settled in the 1490s, since they required a labor force to both produce food and to mine gold. Slavery was not unknown in Indigenous societies. With the arrival of European colonists, enslavement of Indigenous peoples "became commodified, expanded in unexpected ways, and came to resemble the kinds of human trafficking that are recognizable to us today". While the disease was the main killer of indigenous peoples, the practice of slavery and forced labor was also a significant contributor to the indigenous death toll. With the arrival of Europeans other than the Spanish, enslavement of native populations increased since there were no prohibitions against slavery until decades later. It is estimated that from Columbus's arrival to the end of the 19th century between 2.5 and 5 million Native Americans were forced into slavery. Indigenous men, women, and children were often forced into labor in sparsely populated frontier settings, in the household, or in the toxic gold and silver mines. This practice was known as the encomienda system and granted free native labor to the Spaniards. Based upon the practice of exacting tribute from Muslims and Jews during the Reconquista, the Spanish Crown granted a number of native laborers to an encomendero, who was usually a conquistador or other prominent Spanish male. Under the grant, they were theoretically bound to both protect the natives and convert them to Christianity. In exchange for their forced conversion to Christianity, the natives paid tributes in the form of gold, agricultural products, and labor. The Spanish Crown tried to terminate the system through the Laws of Burgos (1512–13) and the New Laws of the Indies (1542). However, the encomenderos refused to comply with the new measures and the indigenous people continued to be exploited. Eventually, the encomienda system was replaced by the repartimiento system which was not abolished until the late 18th century.

In the Caribbean, deposits of gold were quickly exhausted and the precipitous drop in the indigenous population meant a severe labor shortage. Spaniards sought a high-value, low-bulk export product to make their fortunes. Cane sugar was the answer. It had been cultivated on the Iberian Atlantic islands. It was a highly desirable, expensive foodstuff. The problem of a labor force was solved by the importation of African slaves, initiating the creation of sugar plantations worked by chattel slaves. Plantations required a significant workforce to be purchased, housed, and fed; capital investment in building sugar mills on-site, since once cane was cut, the sugar content rapidly declined. Plantation owners were linked to creditors and a network of merchants to sell processed sugar in Europe. The whole system was predicated on a huge, enslaved population. The Portuguese controlled the African slave trade, since the division of spheres with Spain in the Treaty of Tordesillas, they controlled the African coasts. Black slavery dominated the labor force in tropical zones, particularly where sugar was cultivated, in Portuguese Brazil, the English, French, and Dutch Caribbean islands. On the mainland of North America, the English southern colonies imported black slaves, starting in Virginia in 1619, to cultivate other tropical or semi-tropical crops such as tobacco, rice, and cotton.

Although black slavery is most associated with agricultural production, in Spanish America enslaved and free blacks and mulattoes were found in numbers in cities, working as artisans. Most newly transported African slaves were not Christians, but their conversion was a priority. For the Catholic Church, black slavery was not incompatible with Christianity. The Jesuits created hugely profitable agricultural enterprises and held a significant black slave labor force. European whites often justified the practice through the belts of latitude theory, supported by Aristotle and Ptolemy. In this perspective, belts of latitude wrapped around the Earth and corresponded with specific human traits. The peoples from the "cold zone" in Northern Europe were "of lesser prudence", while those of the "hot zone" in sub-Sahara Africa were intelligent but "weaker and less spirited". According to the theory, those of the "temperate zone" across the Mediterranean reflected an ideal balance of strength and prudence. Such ideas about latitude and character justified a natural human hierarchy.

African slaves were a highly valuable commodity, enriching those involved in the trade. Africans were transported to slave ships to the Americas and were primarily obtained from their African homelands by coastal tribes who captured and sold them. Europeans traded for slaves with the local native African tribes who captured them elsewhere in exchange for rum, guns, gunpowder, and other manufactures. The total slave trade to islands in the Caribbean, Brazil, the Portuguese, Spanish, French, Dutch, and British Empires is estimated to have involved 12 million Africans. The vast majority of these slaves went to sugar colonies in the Caribbean and to Brazil, where life expectancy was short and the numbers had to be continually replenished. At most about 600,000 African slaves were imported into the United States, or 5% of the 12 million slaves brought across from Africa.

== Colonization and race ==
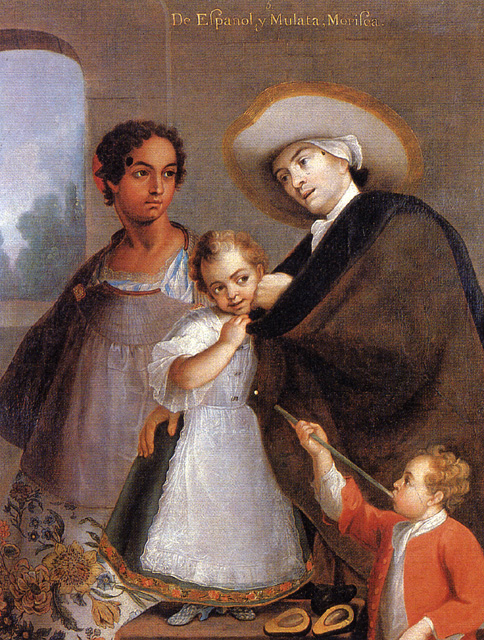
Castas painting depicting Spaniard and mulatta spouse with their morisca daughter by Miguel Cabrera, 1763

Throughout the South American hemisphere, there were three large regional sources of populations: Native Americans, arriving Europeans, and forcibly transported Africans. The mixture of these cultures impacted the ethnic makeup that predominates in the hemisphere's largely independent states today. The term to describe someone of mixed European and indigenous ancestry is mestizo while the term to describe someone of mixed European and African ancestry is mulatto. The mestizo and mulatto population are specific to Iberian-influenced current-day Latin America because the conquistadors had (often forced) sexual relations with the indigenous and African women. The social interaction of these three groups of people inspired the creation of a caste system based on skin tone. The hierarchy centered around those with the lightest skin tone and ordered from highest to lowest was the Peninsulares, Criollos, mestizos, indigenous, mulatto, then African.

Unlike the Iberians, the British men came with families with whom they planned to permanently live in what is now North America. They kept the natives on the margins of colonial society. Because the British colonizers' wives were present, the British men rarely had sexual relations with the native women. While the mestizo and mulatto population make up the majority of people in Latin America today, there is only a small mestizo population in present-day North America (excluding Central America).

== Colonization and gender ==
By the early to mid-16th century, even the Iberian men began to carry their wives and families to the Americas. Some women even carried out the voyage alone. Later, more studies of the role of women and female migration from Europe to the Americas have been made. By the 19th century, the arrival of missionaries in Indigenous territories, along with the imposition of Western educational systems, had introduced colonial concepts of gender to the Americas.

== Impact of colonial land ownership on long-term development ==
Eventually, most of the Western Hemisphere came under the control of Western European governments, leading to changes to its landscape, population, and plant and animal life. In the 19th century, over 50 million people left Western Europe for the Americas. The post-1492 era is known as the period of the Columbian exchange, a dramatically widespread exchange of animals, plants, culture, human populations (including slaves), ideas, and communicable disease between the American and Afro-Eurasian hemispheres following Columbus's voyages to the Americas.

Most scholars writing at the end of the 19th century estimated that the pre-Columbian population was as low as 10 million; by the end of the 20th century most scholars gravitated to a middle estimate of around 50 million, with some historians arguing for an estimate of 100 million or more. A recent estimate is that there were about 60.5 million people living in the Americas immediately before depopulation, of which 90 per cent, mostly in Central and South America, perished from wave after wave of disease, along with war and slavery playing their part.

Geographic differences between the colonies played a large determinant in the types of political and economic systems that later developed. In their paper on institutions and long-run growth, economists Daron Acemoglu, Simon Johnson, and James A. Robinson argue that certain natural endowments gave rise to distinct colonial policies promoting either smallholder or coerced labor production. Densely settled populations, for example, were more easily exploitable and profitable as slave labor. In these regions, landowning elites were economically incentivized to develop forced labor arrangements such as the Peru mit'a system or Argentinian latifundias without regard for democratic norms. French and British colonial leaders, conversely, were incentivized to develop capitalist markets, property rights, and democratic institutions in response to natural environments that supported smallholder production over forced labor.

James Mahoney proposes that colonial policy choices made at critical junctures regarding land ownership in coffee-rich Central America fostered enduring path dependent institutions. Coffee economies in Guatemala and El Salvador, for example, were centralized around large plantations that operated under coercive labor systems. By the 19th century, their political structures were largely authoritarian and militarized. In Colombia and Costa Rica, conversely, liberal reforms were enacted at critical junctures to expand commercial agriculture, and they ultimately raised the bargaining power of the middle class. Both nations eventually developed more democratic and egalitarian institutions than their highly concentrated landowning counterparts.

== List of European colonies in the Americas ==
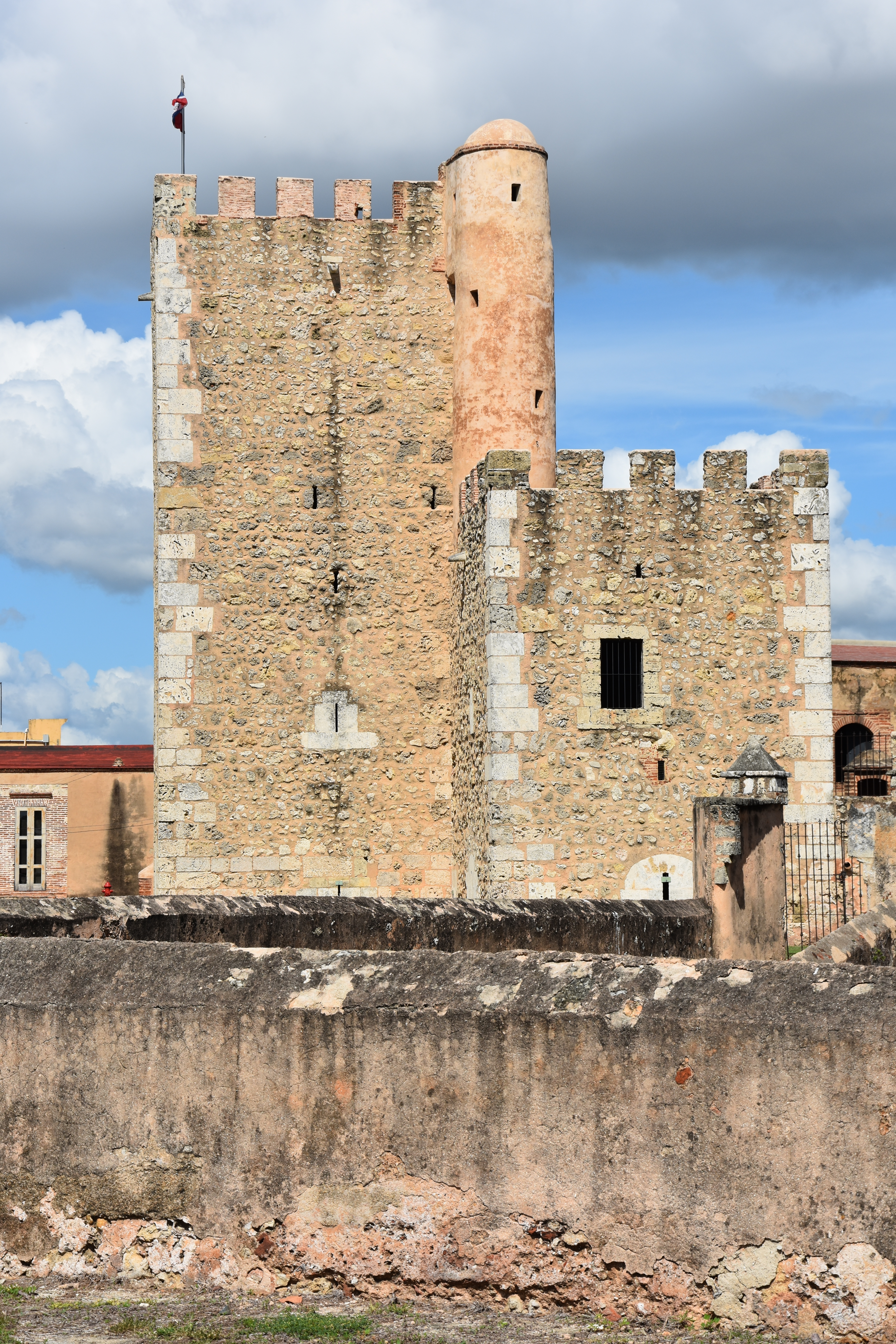
Santo Domingo, Dominican Republic. Founded in 1496, the city is the oldest continuously inhabited European settlement in the New World.

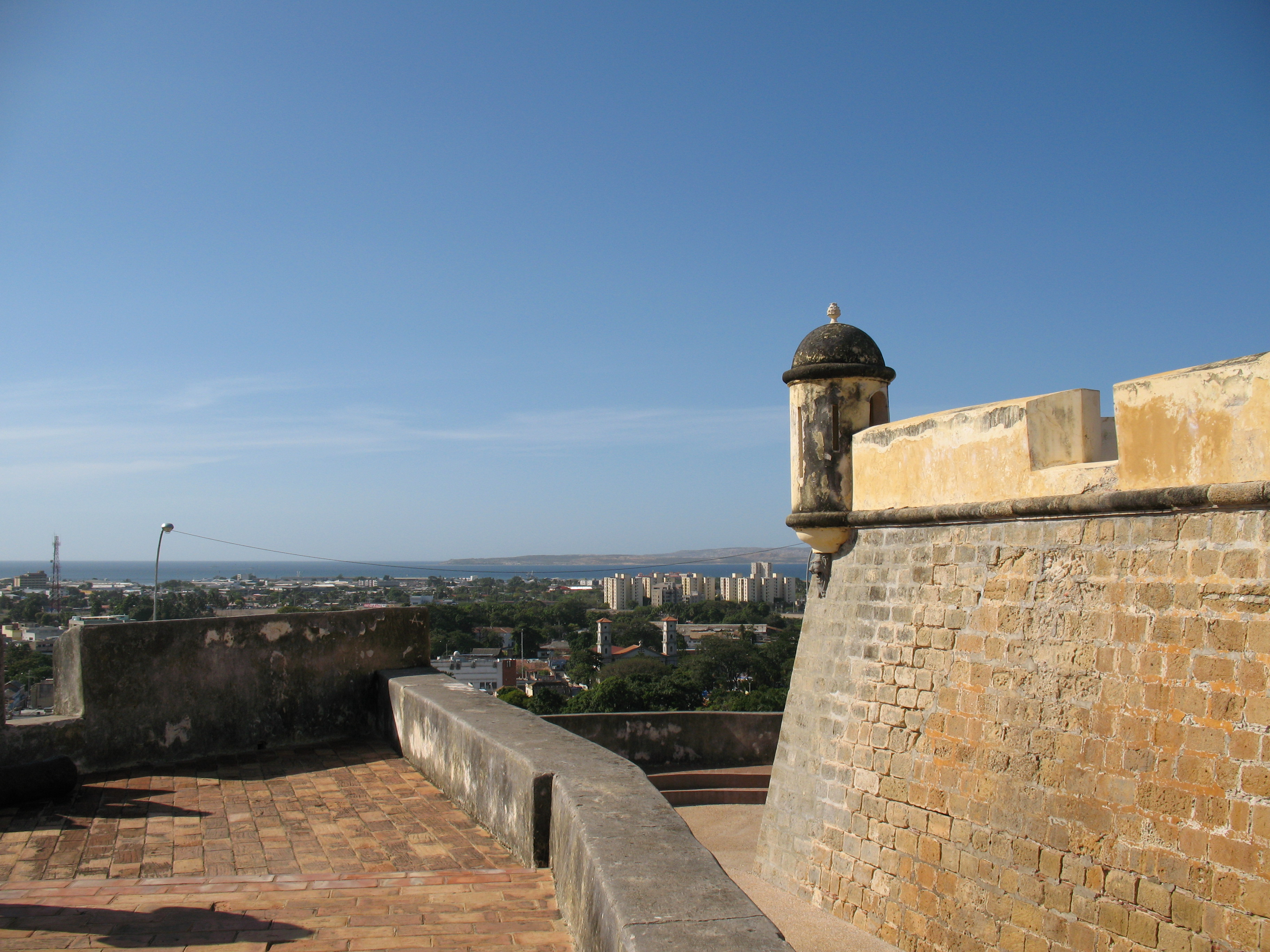
Cumaná, Venezuela. Founded in 1510, it is the oldest continuously inhabited European city in the continental Americas.

There were at least a dozen European countries involved in the colonization of the Americas. The following list indicates those countries and the Western Hemisphere territories they worked to control.

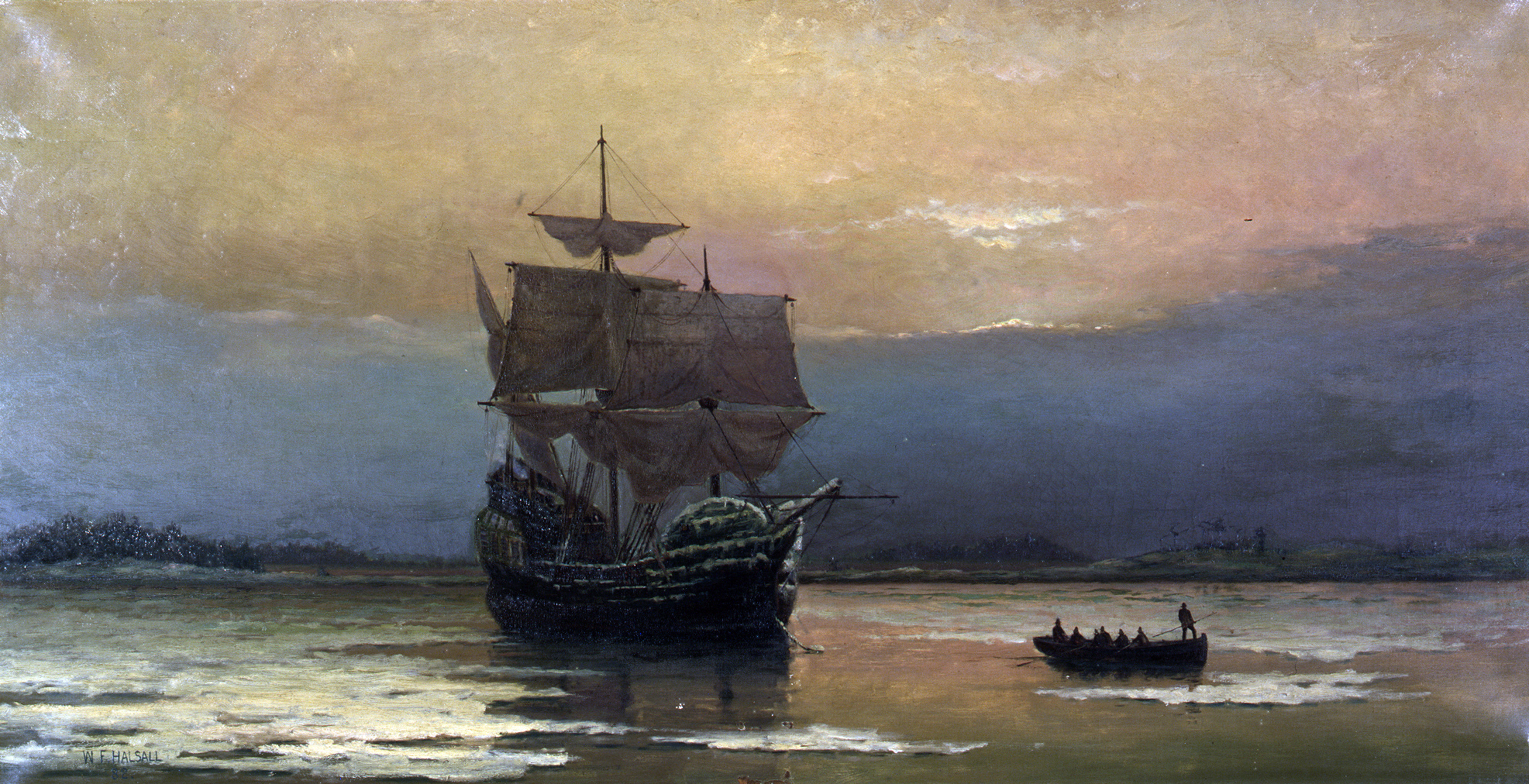
Mayflower, the ship that carried a colony of English Puritans to North America

=== British and (before 1707) English ===
- British America (1607–1783)
  - Thirteen Colonies (1607–1783)
  - Rupert's Land (1670–1870)
  - British Columbia (1793–1871)
  - British North America (1783–1907)
- British West Indies
- Belize

=== Duchy of Courland and Semigallia ===
- New Courland (Tobago, Trinidad and Tobago) (1654–1689); Courland is now part of Latvia

=== Danish ===
- Dano-Norwegian West Indies (1754–1814)
- Danish West Indies (1814–1917)
- Dano-Norwegian North Greenland (1721–1814)
- Dano-Norwegian South Greenland (1728?–1814)
- Greenland (1814–1953)

=== Dutch ===
- New Netherland (1614–1667)
- Essequibo (1616–1815)
- Dutch Virgin Islands (1625–1680)
- Berbice (1627–1815)
- New Walcheren (1628–1677)
- Dutch Brazil (1630–1654)
- Pomeroon (1650–1689)
- Cayenne (1658–1664)
- Demerara (1745–1815)
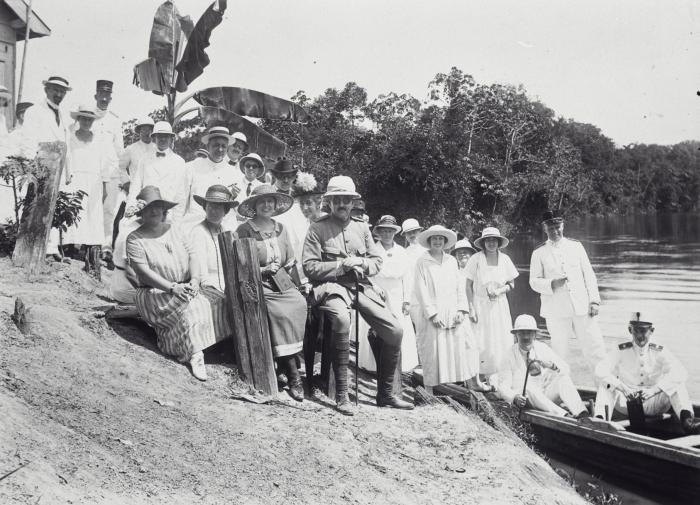
  Baron Aarnoud van Heemstra, the governor of the Dutch colony of Suriname, 1923
- Suriname (1667–1954) (Remained within the Kingdom of the Netherlands until 1975 as a constituent country)
- Curaçao and Dependencies (1634–1954) (Aruba and Curaçao are still in the Kingdom of the Netherlands, Bonaire; 1634–present)
- Sint Eustatius and Dependencies (1636–1954) (Sint Maarten is still in the Kingdom of the Netherlands, Sint Eustatius and Saba; 1636–present)

=== French ===
- Present-day Canada
  - New France (1534–1763), and nearby lands:
    - Acadia (1604–1713)
    - Newfoundland
    - Hudson Bay
    - Saint Lawrence River
    - Great Lakes
    - Lake Winnipeg
    - Quebec
- Present-day United States
  - The Fort Saint Louis (Texas) (1685–1689)
  - Saint Croix, U.S. Virgin Islands (1650–1733)
  - Fort Caroline in French Florida (occupation by Huguenots) (1562–1565)
  - Vincennes and Fort Ouiatenon in Indiana
  - French Louisiana (23.3% of the current U.S. territory) (1801–1804) (sold by Napoleon I) (also see: Louisiana (New Spain))
    - Lower Louisiana
    - Upper Louisiana
  - Louisiana (New France) (1672–1764)
- French Guiana (1763–present)
- French West Indies
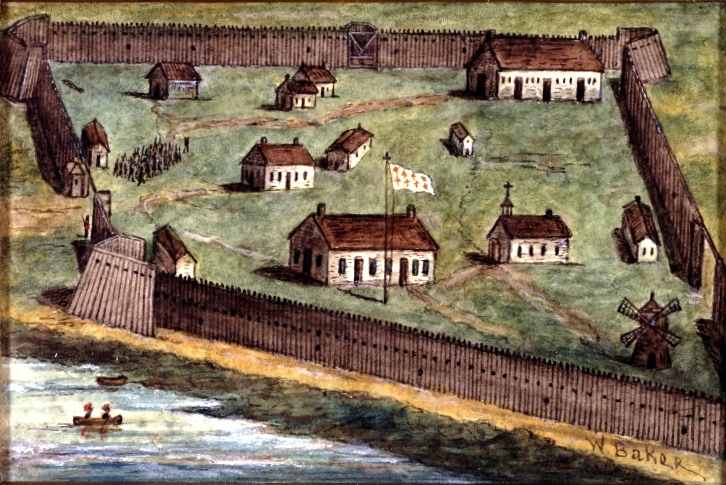
  Fort Lachine in New France, 1689
- Saint-Domingue (1659–1804, now Haiti)
- Tobago
- Virgin Islands
- France Antarctique (1555–1567)
- Equinoctial France (1612–1615)
- French Florida (1562–1565)
- Present-day Dominican Republic (1795–1809)
- Present-day Suriname
  - Tapanahony (District of Sipaliwini) (Controversial Franco-Dutch in favour of the Netherlands) (25.8% of the current territory) (1814)
- Present-day Guyana (1782–1784)
- Present-day Saint Kitts and Nevis
  - Saint Christopher Island (1628–1690, 1698–1702, 1706, 1782–1783)
  - Nevis (1782–1784)
- Present-day Antigua and Barbuda
  - Antigua (briefly in 1666)
- Present-day Trinidad and Tobago
  - Tobago (1666–1667, 1781–1793, 1802–1803)
- Dominica (1625–1763, 1778–1783)
- Grenada (1650–1762, 1779–1783)
- Saint Vincent and the Grenadines (1719–1763, 1779–1783)
- Saint Lucia (1650–1723, 1756–1778, 1784–1803)
- Turks and Caicos Islands (1783)
- Montserrat (1666, 1712)
- Falkland Islands (1504, 1701, 1764–1767)
- Îles des Saintes (1648–present)
- Marie-Galante (1635–present)
- la Désirade (1635–present)
- Guadeloupe (1635–present)
- Martinique (1635–present)
- French Guiana (1604–present)
- Saint Pierre and Miquelon (1604–1713, 1763–present)
- Collectivity of Saint Martin (1624–present)
- Saint Barthélemy (1648–1784, 1878–present)
- Clipperton Island (1858–present)

=== Knights of Malta ===
- Saint Barthélemy (1651–1665)
- Saint Christopher (1651–1665)
- Saint Croix (1651–1665)
- Saint Martin (1651–1665)

=== Norwegian ===
- Greenland (986–1408)
- Dano-Norwegian South Greenland (1728?–1814)
- Dano-Norwegian North Greenland (1721–1814)
- Dano-Norwegian West Indies (1754–1814)
- Cooper Island (1844–1905)
- Sverdrup Islands (1898–1930)
- Erik the Red's Land (1931–1933)

=== Portuguese ===
- Colonial Brazil (1500–1815) became a Kingdom, United Kingdom of Portugal, Brazil and the Algarves.
- Terra do Labrador (1499/1500–?) Claimed region (sporadically settled).
- Land of the Corte-Real, also known as Terra Nova dos Bacalhaus (Land of Codfish) – Terra Nova (Newfoundland) (1501–?) Claimed region (sporadically settled).
  - Portugal Cove-St. Philip's (1501–1696)
- Nova Scotia (1519?–1520s?) Claimed region (sporadically settled).
- Barbados (c.1536–1620)
- Colonia do Sacramento (1680–1705/1714–1762/1763–1777 (1811–1817))
- Cisplatina (1811–1822, now Uruguay)
- French Guiana (1809–1817)

=== Russian ===
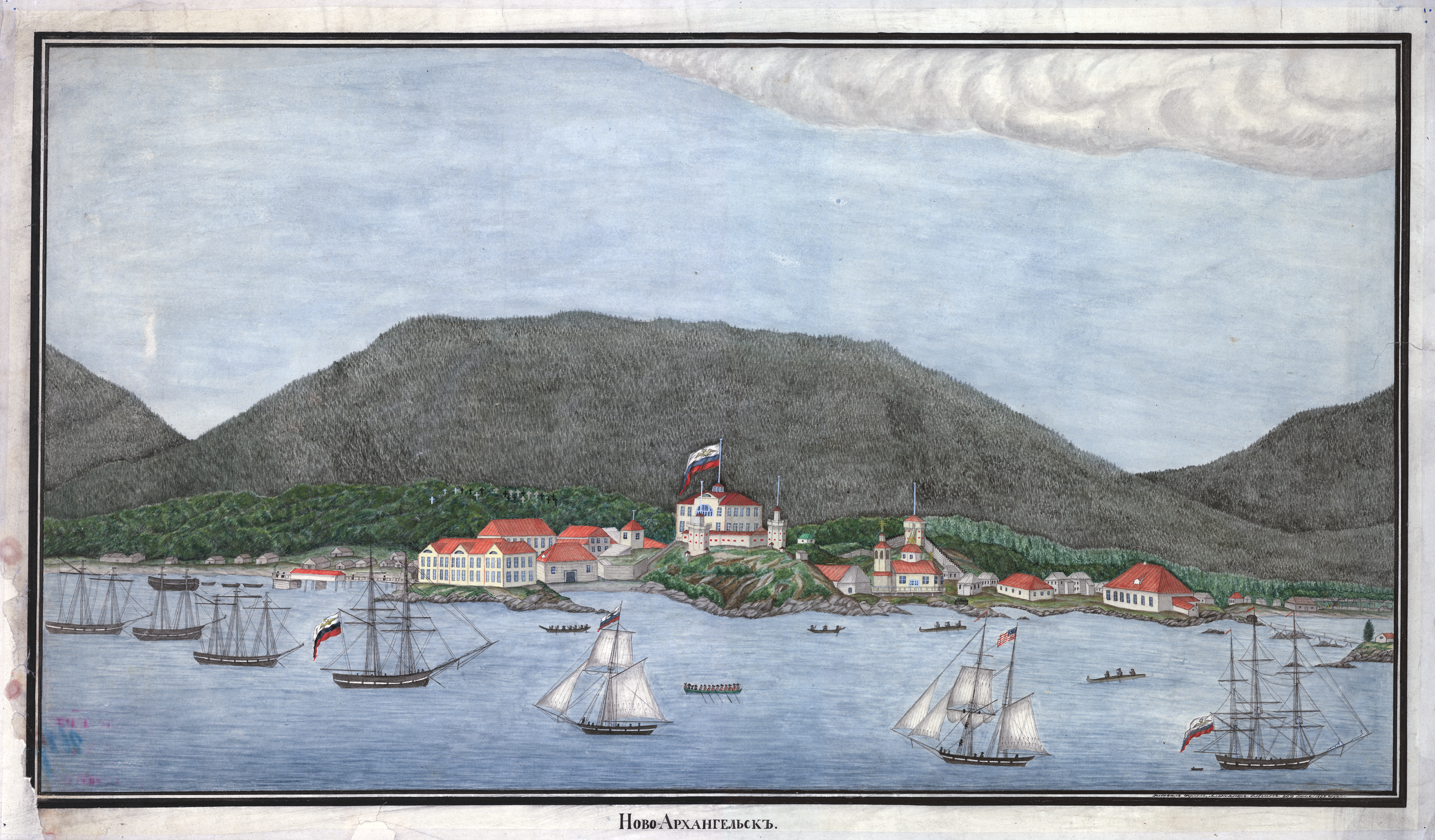
The Russian-American Company's capital at New Archangel (present-day Sitka, Alaska) in 1837

- Russian America (Alaska) (1799–1867)
- Fort Ross (Sonoma County, California)
- Russian Fort Elizabeth (Hawaii)

=== Scottish ===
- Nova Scotia (1622–1632)
- Darien scheme on the Isthmus of Panama (1698–1700)
- Stuarts Town, Carolina (1684–1686)

=== Spanish ===
- Hispaniola (1493–1697); the island currently comprising Haiti and the Dominican Republic, under Spanish rule in whole from 1492 to 1697; under the partial rule under the Captaincy General of Santo Domingo (1697–1821), then again as the Dominican Republic (1861–1865).
- Puerto Rico (1493–1898); first as the Captaincy General of Puerto Rico
- Colony of Santiago (1509–1655); conquered by Britain in 1655, currently Jamaica
- Cuba (1607–1898); first as the Captaincy General of Cuba
- Viceroyalty of New Granada (1717–1819)
  - Captaincy General of Venezuela
- Viceroyalty of New Spain (1535–1821)
  - Nueva Extremadura
  - Nueva Galicia
  - Nuevo Reino de León
  - Nuevo Santander
  - Nueva Vizcaya
  - Las Californias
  - Santa Fe de Nuevo México
  - Captaincy General of Guatemala
- Louisiana (New Spain) (1769–1801)
- Spanish Florida (1565–1763, 1783–1819)
- Spanish Texas (1716–1802)
- Viceroyalty of Peru (1542–1824)
- Captaincy General of Chile (1544–1818)
- Viceroyalty of Rio de la Plata (1776–1814)

=== Swedish ===
- New Sweden (1638–1655)
- Saint Barthélemy (1784–1878)
- Guadeloupe (1813–1814)

== Failed attempts ==
=== German ===
- Klein-Venedig (Holy Roman Empire)
- Hanauish-Indies
- Saint Thomas (Brandenburg colony)

=== Italian ===
- Thornton expedition (now French Guiana)

=== Danish ===
- Nova Dania (now Churchill, Canada)

=== Swedish ===
- Essequibo
- Tobago

== Exhibitions and collections ==
In 2007, the Smithsonian Institution National Museum of American History and the Virginia Historical Society (VHS) co-organized a traveling exhibition to recount the strategic alliances and violent conflict between European empires (English, Spanish, French) and the Native people living in North America. The exhibition was presented in three languages and with multiple perspectives. Artefacts on display included rare surviving Native and European artefacts, maps, documents, and ceremonial objects from museums and royal collections on both sides of the Atlantic. The exhibition opened in Richmond, Virginia on March 17, 2007, and closed at the Smithsonian International Gallery on October 31, 2009.

The related online exhibition explores the international origins of the societies of Canada and the United States and commemorates the 400th anniversary of three lasting settlements in Jamestown (1607), Quebec City (1608), and Santa Fe (1609). The site is accessible in three languages.

== See also ==
- Chronology of the colonization of North America
- Columbian exchange
- European colonization of the Southern United States
- European emigration
- Former colonies and territories in Canada
- Guaicaipuro
- History of the west coast of North America
- List of North American cities founded in chronological order
- Mennonites#Environmental impacts
- Romanus Pontifex
- Spanish conquest of Yucatán
- Timeline of the European colonization of North America
- Timeline of imperialism#Colonization of North America

== Bibliography ==
- Bailyn, Bernard, ed. Atlantic History: Concept and Contours (Harvard UP, 2005)
- Bannon, John Francis. History of the Americas (2 vols. 1952), older textbook
- Blackhawk, Ned; Kiernan, Ben; Madley, Benjamin; Taylor, Rebe, eds. (2023). The Cambridge World History of Genocide. Vol. 2: Genocide in the Indigenous, Early Modern and Imperial Worlds, from c.1535 to World War One. Cambridge University Press. doi:10.1017/9781108765480. ISBN 978-1-108-76548-0.
- Bloxham, Donald; Moses, A. Dirk, eds. (2010). The Oxford Handbook of Genocide Studies. Oxford University Press. doi:10.1093/oxfordhb/9780199232116.001.0001. ISBN 978-0-19-923211-6.
- Bolton, Herbert E. "The Epic of Greater America", American Historical Review 38, no. 3 (April 1933): 448–474 in JSTOR
- Davis, Harold E. The Americas in History (1953), older textbook
- Egerton, Douglas R. et al. The Atlantic World: A History, 1400–1888 (2007)
- Eltis, David. The Rise of African Slavery in the Americas (2000).
- Fernlund, Kevin Jon. A Big History of North America, from Montezuma to Monroe. Columbia: University of Missouri Press. (2022).
- Hinderaker, Eric; Horn, Rebecca. "Territorial Crossings: Histories and Historiographies of the Early Americas", William and Mary Quarterly, (2010) 67#3 pp. 395–432 in JSTOR
- Jones, Adam (2023). Genocide: A Comprehensive Introduction (4th ed.). Taylor & Francis. doi:10.4324/9781003185291. ISBN 978-1-000-95870-6.
- Kiernan, Ben; Lemos, T. M.; Taylor, Tristan S., eds. (2023). The Cambridge World History of Genocide. Vol. 1: Genocide in the Ancient, Medieval and Premodern Worlds. Cambridge University Press. doi:10.1017/9781108655989. ISBN 978-1-108-65598-9.
- Lockhart, James, and Stuart B. Schwartz. Early Latin America: A History of Colonial Spanish America and Brazil (1983).
- McNeill, J. R.; Pomeranz, Kenneth, eds. (2015). Production, Destruction and Connection, 1750-Present, Part 1, Structures, Spaces, and Boundary Making. The Cambridge World History. Vol. 7. Cambridge University Press. doi:10.1017/CBO9781139196079. ISBN 978-1-108-40775-5.
- Mancall, P. C. (2026). Contested Continent: The Struggle for North America, c. 1000–1680 (Hardcover ed.). Oxford University Press.
- Merriman, Roger Bigelow. The Rise of The Spanish Empire in the Old World and in the New (4 vol. 1934)
- Morison, Samuel Eliot. The European Discovery of America: The Northern Voyages, A.D. 500–1600. (1971).
- Morison, Samuel Eliot. The European Discovery of America: The Southern Voyages, 1492–1616. (1971).
- Parry, J.H. The Age of Reconnaissance: Discovery, Exploration, and Settlement, 1450–1650. (1982).
- Pyne, Stephen J. The Great Ages of Discovery: How Western Civilization Learned About a Wider World. Tucson: University of Arizona Press. (2021).
- Sarson, Steven, and Jack P. Greene, eds. The American Colonies and the British Empire, 1607–1783 (8 vol, 2010); primary sources
- Sobecki, Sebastian. "New World Discovery". Oxford Handbooks Online (2015). doi:10.1093/oxfordhb/9780199935338.013.141
- Starkey, Armstrong (1998). European-Native American Warfare, 1675–1815. University of Oklahoma Press ISBN 978-0-8061-3075-0
- Vickers, Daniel, ed. A Companion to Colonial America. (2003).
