= Theodoor Galle =

Flemish Baroque engraver

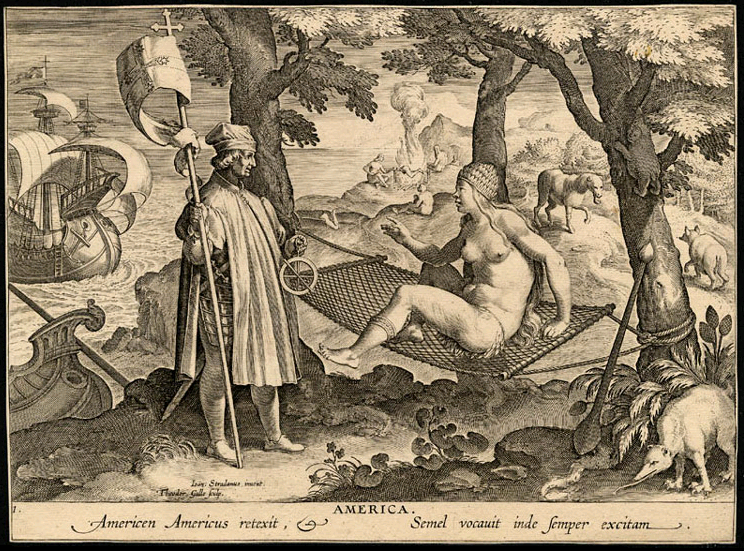
- America engraving by Theodor Galle after Stradanus, c. 1630
- Born: Dirck; 16 July 1571; Antwerp
- Died: 8 December 1633 (aged 62); Antwerp
- Known for: Engraving
- Movement: Baroque
- Children: Jan

Dirck or Theodoor Galle (16 July 1571 – 18 December 1633) was a Flemish Baroque engraver.

== Biography ==
Theodoor (Dirck) Galle learned the art of engraving from his father, Philip Galle. Dirck later married Catharina Moerentorff (Moretus), daughter of the prominent printer Jan Moretus and Maertine Plantijn. Maertine was the daughter of the founder of the Plantin Moretus printing house in Antwerp Christophe Plantin. Galle was one of the engravers linked to the Plantin Moretus press.

He became a member of the Guild of St. Luke in 1595, and became deacon in 1609.

He was the teacher of his son Jan Galle, and the engravers Adriaen Millaert, and Gilles van Schoor. Joannes Galle later became a member of the Guild of St. Luke in 1627, and became deacon in 1638.
