= Essequibo =

Essequibo is the largest traditional region of Guyana but not an administrative region of Guyana today. It may also refer to:

- Essequibo River, the largest river in Guyana
- Essequibo (colony), a former Dutch colony in what is now Guyana;
- Essequibo Islands-West Demerara, an administrative region of Guyana today
- Guayana Esequiba, also called Essequibo, Spanish name of a region administered and controlled by Guyana and internationally recognised as part of its territory but also claimed by Venezuela
- Essequibo cricket team, a former first-class cricket team in Guyana
