= Jan Galle =

Flemish engraver

Jan Galle (1600–1676) was a Flemish engraver, a son and pupil of Theodoor Galle. He was born at Antwerp, and died there in 1676.

Among his plates are:

- The Wise and Foolish Virgins; after Maerten de Vos
- Twelve plates of Old Testament History
- Christ surrounded by the Instruments of His Passion
- The fat Cook and the thin Cook; after Pieter Bruegel the Elder
- Lubricitas Vitae Humanae; after the same, 1553
- Judith giving the Head of Holofernes to a Slave; after Hendrick Goltzius
