= Christian views on slavery =

Christian views on slavery are varied regionally, historically and spiritually. Slavery in various forms has been a part of the social environment for much of Christianity's history, spanning well over eighteen centuries. Saint Augustine described slavery as being against God's intention and resulting from sin. The earliest elaboration of abolition that survives from antiquity is Gregory of Nyssa's sermon on owning slaves and pride (380 AD), anticipating the moral groundwork of the abolitionist movement by nearly 1,500 years. In the 1700's the abolition movement took shape among Christians across the globe.

In the eighteenth and nineteenth century debates concerning abolition, passages in the Bible were used by both pro-slavery advocates and abolitionists to support their respective views.

In modern times, various Christian organizations reject the permissibility of slavery.

== Biblical references ==
The Bible uses the Hebrew term eved (עבד) and the Greek term doulos (δοῦλος) to refer to slaves. Eved has a much wider meaning than the English term slave, and in many circumstances it is more accurately translated into English as servant or hired worker. Doulos is more specific, but is also used in more general senses as well: of the Hebrew prophets (Revelation 10:7), of the attitude of Christian leaders toward those they lead (Matthew 20:27), of Christians towards God (1 Peter 2:16), and of Jesus himself (Philippians 2:7).

=== Old Testament ===
Historically, slavery was not just an Israelite phenomenon, as slavery was practiced in other ancient societies, such as Egypt, Babylonia, Greece and Rome. Slavery was an integral part of ancient commerce, taxation, and temple religion.

In the book of Genesis, Noah condemns Canaan (son of Ham) to perpetual servitude: "Cursed be Canaan! The lowest of slaves will he be to his brothers" (Genesis 9:25). T. David Curp notes that this episode has been used to justify racialized slavery, since "Christians and even some Muslims eventually identified Ham's descendants as black Africans". This is widely regarded as a misinterpretation today. Anthony Pagden argued that "This reading of the Book of Genesis merged easily into a medieval iconographic tradition in which devils were always depicted as black. Later pseudo-scientific theories would be built around African skull shapes, dental structure, and body postures, in an attempt to find an unassailable argument - rooted in whatever the most persuasive contemporary idiom happened to be: law, theology, genealogy, or natural science - why one part of the human race should live in perpetual indebtedness to another."

The Canaanites settled in Canaan, rather than Africa, where Ham's other sons, Cush and Put, are considered to have most likely settled by those who believe that they were real historical figures. Noah's curse only applied to Canaan, and according to biblical commentator, Gleason L. Archer, this curse was fulfilled when Joshua conquered Canaan in 1400 BC. Although there is considerable doubt about the nature and extent of the conquest described in the early chapters of the book of Joshua, the post-Flood story did supply a rationale for the subjugation of the Canaanites. It is possible that the naming of 'Canaan' in the post-Flood story is itself a reflection of the situation of warfare between peoples in the time when the written form of the story took shape. Due to Canaanites being identified as Ethiopian, it was presumed that this curse was towards all Africans.

Some forms of servitude, customary in ancient times, were condoned by the Torah. Hebrew legislation maintained kinship rights (Exodus 21:3, 9, Leviticus 25:41, 47–49, 54, providing for Hebrew indentured servants), marriage rights (Exodus 21:4, 10–11, providing for a Hebrew daughter contracted into a marriage), personal legal rights relating to physical protection and protection from breach of conduct (Exodus 21:8, providing for a Hebrew daughter contracted into a marriage, Exodus 21:20–21, 26–27, providing for Hebrew or foreign servants of any kind, and Leviticus 25:39–41, providing for Hebrew indentured servants), freedom of movement, and access to liberty.

Hebrews would be punished if they beat a slave causing death within a day or two, and would have to let a slave go free if they were to destroy a slave's eye or tooth, force a slave to work on the Sabbath, return an escaped slave of another people who had taken refuge among the Israelites, or to slander a slave. It was common for a person to voluntarily sell oneself into slavery for a fixed period of time either to pay off debts or to get food and shelter. It was seen as legitimate to enslave captives obtained through warfare, but not through kidnapping for the purpose of enslaving them. Children could also be sold into debt bondage, which was sometimes ordered by a court of law.

The Bible does set minimum rules for the conditions under which slaves were to be kept. Slaves were to be treated as part of an extended family; they were allowed to celebrate the Sukkot festival, and expected to honor Shabbat. Israelite slaves could not be compelled to work with rigor, and debtors who sold themselves as slaves to their creditors had to be treated the same as a hired servant. If a master harmed a slave in one of the ways covered by the lex talionis, the slave was to be compensated by manumission; if the slave died within 24 to 48 hours, it was to be avenged (whether this refers to the death penalty or not is uncertain).

Israelite slaves were automatically manumitted after six years of work, and/or at the next Jubilee (occurring either every 49 or every 50 years, depending on interpretation), although the latter would not apply if the slave was owned by an Israelite and was not in debt bondage. Slaves released automatically in their 7th year of service. This provision did not include females sold into concubinage by impoverished parents; instead their rights over against another wife were protected. In other texts male and female slaves are both to be released after the sixth year of service. Liberated slaves were to be given livestock, grain, and wine as a parting gift. This 7th-year manumission could be voluntarily renounced. If a male slave had been given another slave in marriage, and they had a family, the wife and children remained the property of the master. However, if the slave was happy with his master, and wished to stay with a wife that his owner gave to him, he could renounce manumission, an act which would be signified, as in other Ancient Near Eastern nations, by the slave gaining a ritual ear piercing. After such renunciation, the individual became his master's slave forever (and was therefore not released at the Jubilee). These are provisions for slavery/service among Israelites. Non-Israelite slaves could be enslaved indefinitely and were to be treated as inheritable property.

=== New Testament ===
Early Christians reputedly regarded slaves who converted to Christianity as spiritually free men, brothers in Christ, receiving the same portion of Christ's kingdom inheritance. These slaves were also told to obey their masters "with fear and trembling, in sincerity of heart, as to Christ." (Ephesians 6:5 KJV) Paul the Apostle applied the same guidelines to masters in Ephesians 6:9: "And, masters, do the same to them. Stop threatening them, for you know that both of you have the same Master in heaven, and with him there is no partiality." Nevertheless, verses like Ephesians 6:5 were still used by defenders of slavery prior to the American Civil War. Slaves were encouraged by Paul in the first Corinthian Epistle to seek or purchase their freedom whenever possible (1 Corinthians 7:21).

Avery Robert Dulles claimed that "Jesus, though he repeatedly denounced sin as a kind of moral slavery, said not a word against slavery as a social institution", and believed that the writers of the New Testament did not oppose slavery either. In a paper published in Evangelical Quarterly, Kevin Giles claimed that, while he often encountered the claim, "not one word of criticism did the Lord utter against slavery"; moreover, a number of his stories are set in a slave/master situation, and involve slaves as key characters. Giles noted that these circumstances were used by pro-slavery apologists in the 19th century to suggest that Jesus approved of slavery. However, it should be also be noted that in what the Gospel of Luke reports as his first public teaching, Jesus explicitly stated: "The Spirit of the Lord is upon me, because he has anointed me to bring good news to the poor. He has sent me to proclaim release to the captives and recovery of sight to the blind, to let the oppressed go free, to proclaim the year of the Lord’s favor" (Luke 4:18-19).

It is clear from all the New Testament material that slavery was a basic part of the social and economic environment. Many of the early Christians were slaves. In several Pauline epistles, and the First Epistle of Peter, slaves are admonished to obey their masters. Masters were also told to serve their slaves in obedience to God by "giving up threatening". The basic principle was "you have the same Master in heaven, and with him there is no partiality." The author of 1 Peter was aware that there were masters that were gentle and masters that were harsh; slaves in the latter situation were to make sure that their behaviour was beyond reproach, and if punished for doing right, to endure the suffering as Christ also endured it. The key theological text is Paul's declaration in Epistle to the Galatians (Galatians 3:28): "There is neither Jew nor Greek, slave nor free, male nor female, for you are all one in Christ Jesus", suggesting that Christians take off these titles because they are now clothed in Christ.

Paul's Epistle to Philemon was an important text for both pro-slavery advocates and abolitionists. This short letter, reputedly written to be delivered by the hand of Onesimus, a fugitive slave, whom Paul is sending back to his master Philemon. Paul entreats Philemon to regard Onesimus as a beloved brother in Christ. Cardinal Dulles points out that, "while discreetly suggesting that he manumit Onesimus, [Paul] does not say that Philemon is morally obliged to free Onesimus and any other slaves he may have had." He does, however, encourage Philemon to welcome Onesimus "not as a slave, but as more than a slave, as a beloved brother".

The instructions to slaves in the Epistle to Titus, as is the case in Ephesians, appear among a list of instructions for people in a range of life situations. The usefulness to the 19th century pro-slavery apologists of the epistle's contents is obvious: "Tell slaves to be submissive to their masters and to give satisfaction in every respect; they are not to talk back, not to pilfer, but to show complete and perfect fidelity, so that in everything they may be an ornament to the doctrine of God our Savior."

Paul advises that "each man must remain in that condition in which he was called." For slaves, however, he specifically adds this: "Were you called while a slave? Do not be concerned about it. But if you are able to gain your freedom, avail yourself of the opportunity." And then follows a wider principle: "For whoever was called in the Lord as a slave is a freed person belonging to the Lord, just as whoever was free when called is a slave of Christ."

The First Epistle to Timothy—in some translations—reveals a disdain for the slave trade, proclaiming it to be contrary to sound doctrine. The author explains to Timothy that those who live a life based on love do not have to fear the law of God; that (NIV version) "the law is laid down not for the innocent but for the lawless and disobedient, for the godless and sinful, for the unholy and profane, for those who kill their father or mother, for murderers, fornicators, sodomites, slave traders, liars, perjurers, and whatever else is contrary to the sound teaching that conforms to the gospel concerning the glory of the blessed God, which he entrusted to me."

== In the Roman Empire ==
Slavery was the bedrock of the Roman and world economy. Some estimate that the slave population in the 1st century constituted approximately one third of the total population. An estimated one million slaves were owned by the richest five per cent of Roman citizens. Most slaves were employed in domestic service in households and likely had an easier life than slaves working the land, or in mines or on ships. Slavery could be very cruel in the Roman Empire, and revolts severely punished, and professional slave-catchers were hired to hunt down runaways, with advertisements containing precise descriptions of fugitives being publicly posted and offering rewards.

The Book of Acts refers to a synagogue of Libertines (Λιβερτίνων), in Jerusalem. As a Latin term this would refer to freedmen, and it is therefore occasionally suggested that the Jews captured by Pompey, in 63 BC, gathered into a distinct group after their individual manumissions. However, the Book of Acts was written in Greek, and the name appears in a list of five synagogues, the other four being named after cities or countries; for these reasons, its now more often suggested that this biblical reference is a typographical error for Libystines (Λιβυστίνων), in reference to Libya (in other words, referring to Libyans).

== Christianity's view ==
Early Christian thought exhibited some signs of kindness towards slaves. Christianity recognised marriage of sorts among slaves, and freeing slaves could be an act of charity.

The earliest elaboration of abolition that survives from antiquity is Gregory of Nyssa's sermon on owning slaves and pride (380 AD), anticipating the moral groundwork of the abolitionist movement by nearly 1,500 years.

Though the Jewish Pentateuch gave protection to fugitive slaves, the Roman church often condemned slaves who fled from their masters, and refused them communion.

Since the Middle Ages, the Christian understanding of slavery has seen significant internal conflict and endured dramatic change. One notable example where church mission activities in the Caribbean were directly supported by the proceeds of slave ownership was under the terms of a charitable bequest in 1710 to the Society for the Propagation of the Gospel in Foreign Parts. The Codrington Plantations in Barbados were granted to the Society to fund the establishment of Codrington College. In the first decade of ownership, several hundred slaves at the plantation estates were branded on their chests, using the traditional red hot iron, with the word Society, to signify their ownership by the Christian organisation. Slave ownership at the Codrington Plantations only finally came to an end in 1833, when slavery was abolished in Barbados. The Church of England has since apologised for the "sinfulness of our predecessors" with the history of these plantation estates highlighted as example of the church's inconsistent approach to slavery.

=== Patristic era ===
In 340 the Synod of Gangra (in present-day Turkey) condemned certain Manicheans for a list of twenty practices including forbidding marriage, not eating meat, urging that slaves should liberate themselves, abandoning their families, asceticism and reviling married priests. The later Council of Chalcedon declared that the canons of the Synod of Gangra were ecumenical (in other words, they were viewed as conclusively representative of the wider church).

Saint Augustine described slavery as being against God's intention and resulting from sin.

Theodore of Mopsuestia In Commentary on Philemon 2.264.10–14, he comments that some Christian ecclesiastics of his day 'would write with great authority that a slave who joined us in the faith and hastened to the true religion of his own free will should be freed from slavery. For there are many such people today, who want to be seen to be wary of imposing onerous commands on others.

John Chrysostom described slavery as 'the fruit of covetousness, of degradation, of savagery ... the fruit of sin, [and] of [human] rebellion against ... our true Father' in his Homilies on Ephesians. Moreover, quoting partly from Paul the Apostle, Chrysostom opposed unfair and unjust forms of slavery by giving these instructions to those who owned slaves: " 'And ye masters', he continues, 'do the same things unto them'. The same things. What are these? 'With good-will do service' ... and 'with fear and trembling' ... toward God, fearing lest He one day accuse you for your negligence toward your slaves ... 'And forbear threatening;' be not irritating, he means, nor oppressive ... [and masters are to obey] the law of the common Lord and Master of all ... doing good to all alike ... dispensing the same rights to all". In his Homilies on Philemon, Chrysostom opposes unfair and unjust forms of slavery by stating that those who own slaves are to love their slaves with the Love of Christ: "this ... is the glory of a Master, to have grateful slaves. And this is the glory of a Master, that He should thus love His slaves ... Let us therefore be stricken with awe at this so great love of Christ. Let us be inflamed with this love-potion. Though a man be low and mean, yet if we hear that he loves us, we are above all things warmed with love towards him, and honor him exceedingly. And do we then love? And when our Master loves us so much, we are not excited?".

By the early 4th century, the manumission in the church, a form of emancipation, was added in the Roman law. Slaves could be freed by a ritual in a church, performed by a Christian bishop or priest. It is not known if baptism was required before this ritual. Subsequent laws, as the Novella 142 of Justinian, gave to the bishops the power to free slaves.

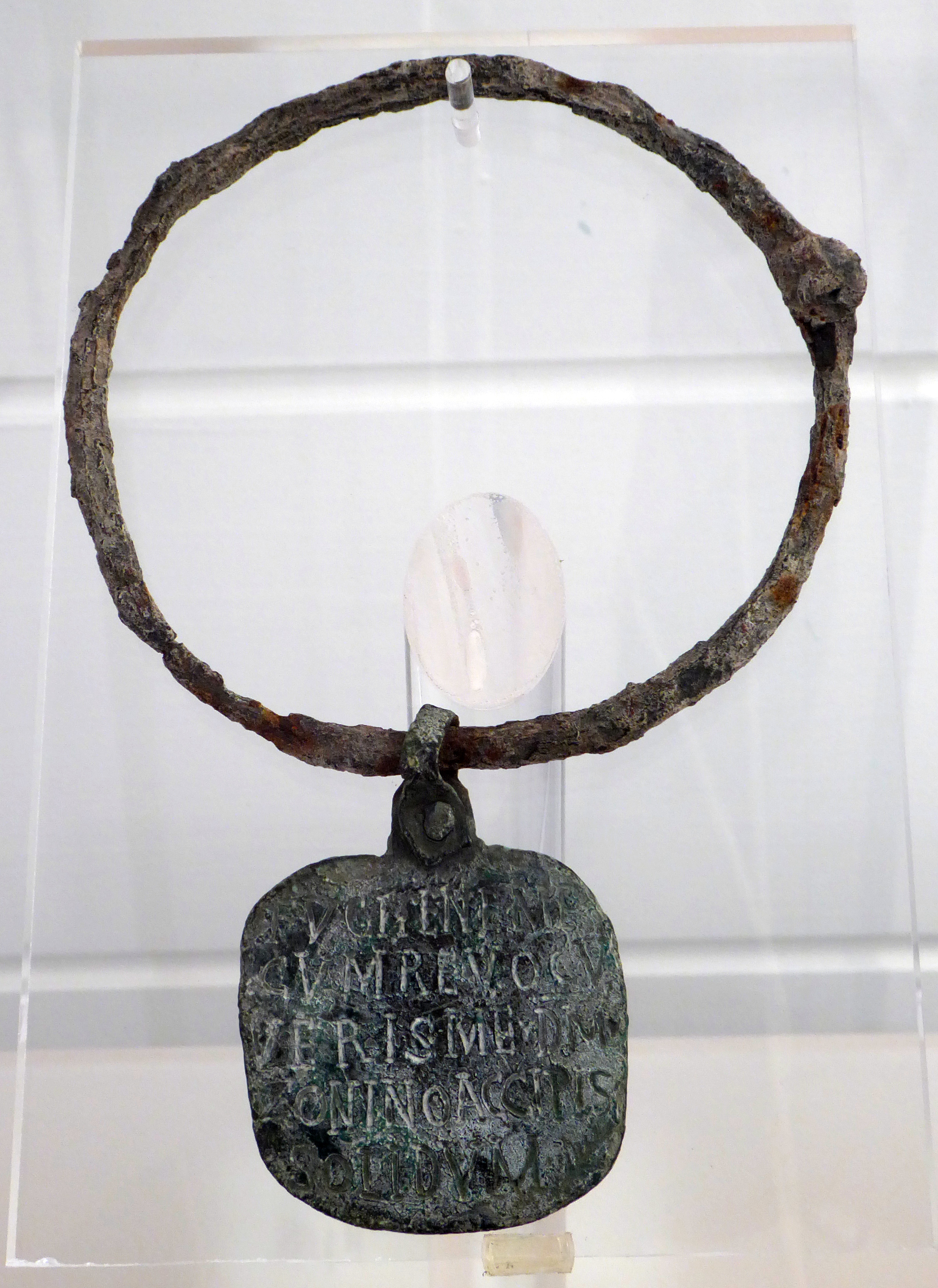
The Zoninus collar, a late Roman slave collar (4th–5th century CE) with an inscription identifying the wearer as a runaway slave and offering a reward for his return (Rome, Museo Nazionale Romano)

Several early figures, while not openly advocating abolition, did make sacrifices to emancipate or free slaves seeing liberation of slaves as a worthy goal. These include Saint Patrick (415–493), Acacius of Amida (400–425), and Ambrose (337–397 AD).

Gregory of Nyssa (c. 335–394) went even further and stated opposition to all slavery as a practice. Gregory of Nyssa's sermon on owning slaves and pride (380 AD), anticipated the moral groundwork of the abolitionist movement by nearly 1,500 years and is the earliest elaboration of abolition that survives from antiquity. He would tell masters that they and their slaves shared the same origin, the same life, the same sufferings, breathed the same air, saw the same sun, ate the same food, and their two bodies became one dust after death.

Later Saint Eligius (588–650) used his vast wealth to purchase British and Saxon slaves in groups of 50 and 100 in order to set them free.

Saint Pelagia is depicted by James the Deacon as having freed her slaves, male and female, "taking their golden torcs off with her own hands". This is described as a highly virtuous and praiseworthy act, an important part of Pelagia's ending her sinful life as a courtesan and embarking on a virtuous Christian life, eventually achieving sainthood.

Among the Church Fathers, the majority opinion was in favour of the moral permissibility of slavery. According to Augustine, God approved of the flogging of disobedient slaves: "You must use the whip, use it! God allows it. Rather, he is angered if you do not lash the slave. But do it in a loving and not a cruel spirit." John Chrysostom wrote that "to discipline and punish ignorant slaves is a great accolade, and not a perchance commendation". Tertullian condemned the Marcionites for their advocacy of the liberation of slaves: "what is more unrighteous, more unjust, more dishonest, than to benefit a foreign slave in such a way as to take him away from his master, claim him who is someone else's property".

=== Byzantine Empire ===
The Byzantine legal code Ekloge ton nomon of 726/741 for the first time introduced the method of emancipation by baptism, whereby a master or a member of his family "received the slave after baptism by immersion". This measure opened the way to war-captives to be incorporated in the Byzantine society, in both the public and private sector.

A shift in the view of slavery in the Byzantine Empire is noticed, which by the 10th century transformed gradually a slave-object into a slave-subject. The Christian captive or slave is perceived not as a private property but "as an individual endowed with his own thoughts and words". Thus, the Christian perception of slavery weakened the submission of slave to his earthly master by strengthening the ties of man to his God.

=== Middle Ages and Early Modern era ===
In the 6th century, the Vatican promulgated the very first law against slavery, forbidding Jews from owning Christian slaves. Between the 7th and the 8th century France, the Vatican and the Carolingian Empire promulgated laws outlawing the enslavement of Christians and freeing Christian slaves across their territories. This process culminated in 873 AD with Pope John VIII declaring the enslavement of Christians a sin and commanding their release to every Christian country.

In the 10th century Venice, a Christian nation, forbade slave trade in its entirety; a century later the Christian England followed by abolishing not only the slave trade but also serfdom. In the early 13th century, the Sachsenspiegel code of the Holy Roman Empire harshly condemns slavery as "a violation of man's likeness to God", giving legal form to the Christian vision of human rights that was already part of the German culture.

During the 13th century, St. Thomas Aquinas taught that, although the subjection of one person to another (servitus) was not part of the primary intention of the natural law, it was appropriate and socially useful in a world impaired by original sin. According to John Francis Maxwell:

Aquinas ... accepted the new Aristotelian view of slavery as well as the titles of slave ownership derived from Roman civil law, and attempted - without complete success - to reconcile them with Christian patristic tradition. He takes the patristic theme ... that slavery exists as a consequence of original sin and says that it exists according to the "second intention" of nature; it would not have existed in the state of original innocence according to the "first intention" of nature; in this way he can explain the Aristotelian teaching that some people are slaves "by nature" like inanimate instruments, because of their personal sins; for since the slave cannot work for his own benefit[,] slavery is necessarily a punishment. [Aquinas] accepts the symbiotic master-slave relationship as being mutually beneficial. There should be no punishment without some crime, so slavery as a penalty is a matter of positive law. St Thomas' explanation continued to be expounded at least until the end of the 18th century.

Fr. Bede Jarrett, O.P. asserts that Aquinas considered slavery to be a result of sin and was justifiable for that reason. Conversely, Rodney Stark, a sociologist of religion, states that "Saint Thomas Aquinas deduced that slavery was a sin, and a series of popes upheld his position, beginning in 1435..."

Nevertheless, for several decades spanning the late 15th and early 16th centuries, several popes explicitly endorsed the slavery of non-Christians. In 1452, as the Ottoman Empire was besieging Constantinople, the Byzantine Emperor Constantine XI asked for help from Pope Nicholas V. In response, the pope authorized King Afonso V of Portugal to "attack, conquer, and subjugate Saracens, pagans and other enemies of Christ wherever they may be found...", in the bull Dum Diversas (18 June 1452). Rather than putting pressure on the Ottomans, however, the bull approved increased competition in West Africa, by Portuguese traders with Muslim-operated trans-Saharan trading caravans, including the highly profitable so-called Trans Saharan slave trade that had taken place for several centuries. In 1454, Castilians also became involved in trading in various goods in West Africa, and were attacked by Portuguese warships. Enrique IV of Castile threatened war and Afonso V appealed to the Pope to support monopolies on the part of any particular Christian state able to open trade with a particular, non-Christian region or countries. A papal bull, Romanus Pontifex, issued on January 8, 1455, conferred upon Portugal exclusive trading rights to areas between Morocco and the East Indies, with the rights to conquer and convert the inhabitants. A significant concession given by Nicholas in a brief issued to Alfonso V in 1454 extended the rights granted to existing territories to all those that might be taken in the future. and sanctioned the purchase of slaves from "the infidel" (i.e. non-Christian): "many Guineamen and other negroes, taken by force, and some by barter of unprohibited articles, or by other lawful contract of purchase, have been ... converted to the Catholic faith, and it is hoped ... that ... such progress be continued ... [and] either those peoples will be converted to the faith or at least the souls of many of them will be gained for Christ." By dealing directly with local leaders and traders, the Portuguese government sought to control trade with West Africa. In effect, the two bulls issued by Nicholas V conceded to subjects of Christian countries the religious authority to acquire as many slaves from non-Christians as they wished, by force or trade. These concessions were confirmed by bulls issued by Pope Callixtus III (Inter Caetera quae in 1456), Sixtus IV (Aeterni regis in 1481), and Leo X (1514). During the Reconquista of the late 15th century, many Muslims and Jews were enslaved in Iberia (especially after the Castilian-Aragonese victory in the Granada War of 1482–1492).

Following Columbus's first voyage to the Americas, the bulls issued by Nicholas V, Callixtus III and Sixtus IV became the models for subsequent major bulls by Pope Alexander VI, such as Eximiae devotionis (3 May 1493), Inter Caetera (4 May 1493) and Dudum Siquidem (23 September 1493), in which similar monopolies were conferred upon Spain relating to the newly discovered lands in the Americas and the indigenous peoples of the Americas.

In 1537 - after denunciations of slavery by Fr. Bartolomé de las Casas, a former colonist in the West Indies turned Dominican - Pope Paul III revoked the previous authority to enslave indigenous people of the Americas with the bulls Sublimus Dei (also known as Unigenitus and Veritas ipsa) and Altituda divini consolii, as well as a brief for the execution of Sublimus Dei - a document known as Pastorale officium. Sublimus Dei, in particular, was described by Hans-Jürgen Prien as the "Magna Carta" for the human rights of indigenous people in its declaration that "the Indians were human beings and they were not to be robbed of their freedom or possessions". In addition, Pastorale officium decreed a penalty of excommunication for anyone failing to abide by the bulls. Following a dispute between the papacy and the government of Spain, Pastorale officium was annulled the following year, in Non Indecens Videtur. However, the documents issued by Paul III continued to circulate and to be quoted by those opposed to slavery. According to James E. Falkowski, Sublimus Dei "had the effect of revoking" Inter Caetera, but left intact the "duty" of colonists, i.e. "converting the native people".

A series of bulls and encyclicals in 1435, 1537 and 1839 from several popes condemned both slavery and the slave trade.

The Quakers were the first churchmen to openly oppose the English slave trade. They were followed in 1766 by a senior Church of England figure, William Warburton, the Bishop of Gloucester and close friend of anti-slavery champion Lord Mansfield, who, in a "courageous" stand, publicly condemned the practices of the Anglican Society for the Propagation of the Gospel whose possessions included 2 slave plantations in Barbados that they had been bequeathed in 1710. Warburton argued that slavery was a "violation of all things civil and sacred" because humankind was created "free".

In his 1774 work Thoughts on Slavery, John Wesley, Church of England priest and pioneer of Methodism, wrote of the plight of slaves in the West Indies, utterly condemning the slave trade saying it was not only contrary to the Bible, but unreconcilable even with secular notions of justice or mercy.

The grand plea is, "[Slavery is] authorized by law." But can law, human law, change the nature of things? Can it turn darkness into light, or evil into good? By no means... right is right and wrong is wrong still. There must still remain an essential difference between justice and injustice, cruelty and mercy. So that I still ask, who can reconcile this treatment of the negroes, first and last, with either justice or mercy?

— John Wesley, Thoughts on Slavery (1774), p. 16

=== Christian abolitionism ===
Although some abolitionists opposed slavery for purely philosophical reasons, anti-slavery movements attracted strong religious elements. Throughout Europe and the United States, Christians, usually from 'un-institutional' Christian faith movements, not directly connected with traditional state churches, or "non-conformist" believers within established churches, were to be found at the forefront of the abolitionist movements. Among the earliest Christian abolitionist groups that predated the Quakers and both British and American efforts to abolish slavery, the Covenanters took a hard stand against slavery as an institution and pushed for abolition because secular government protected slavery.

In particular, the effects of the Second Great Awakening resulted in many evangelicals working to see the theoretical Christian view, that all people are essentially equal, made more of a practical reality. Freedom of expression within the Western world also helped in enabling opportunity to express their position. Prominent among these abolitionists was Parliamentarian William Wilberforce in England, who wrote in his diary when he was 28 that, "God Almighty has set before me two great objects, the suppression of the Slave Trade and Reformation of Morals." With others he labored, despite determined opposition, to finally abolish the slave trade. Some sermons of the famous English preacher Charles Spurgeon were burned in America due to his censure of slavery, calling it "the foulest blot" and which "may have to be washed out in blood." Methodist founder John Wesley denounced human bondage as "the sum of all villainies", and detailed its abuses. In Georgia, primitive Methodists united with brethren elsewhere in condemning slavery. Many evangelical leaders in the United States such as Presbyterian Charles Finney and Theodore Weld, and women such as Harriet Beecher Stowe (daughter of abolitionist Lyman Beecher) and Sojourner Truth motivated hearers to support abolition. Finney preached that slavery was a moral sin, and so supported its elimination. "I had made up my mind on the question of slavery, and was exceedingly anxious to arouse public attention to the subject. In my prayers and preaching, I so often alluded to slavery, and denounced it. Repentance from slavery was required of souls, once enlightened of the subject, while continued support of the system incurred "the greatest guilt" upon them.

Quakers in particular were early leaders in abolitionism. In 1688 Dutch Quakers in Germantown, Pennsylvania, sent an antislavery petition to the Monthly Meeting of Quakers. By 1727 British Quakers had expressed their official disapproval of the slave trade. Three Quaker abolitionists, Benjamin Lay, John Woolman, and Anthony Benezet, devoted their lives to the abolitionist effort from the 1730s to the 1760s, with Lay founding the Negro School in 1770, which would serve more than 250 pupils. In June 1783 a petition from the London Yearly Meeting and signed by over 300 Quakers was presented to Parliament protesting the slave trade.

In 1787 the Society for Effecting the Abolition of the Slave Trade was formed, with 9 of the 12 founder members being Quakers. During the same year, William Wilberforce was persuaded to take up their cause; as an MP, Wilberforce was able to introduce a bill to abolish the slave trade. Wilberforce first attempted to abolish the trade in 1791, but could only muster half the necessary votes; however, after transferring his support to the Whigs, it became an election issue. Abolitionist pressure had changed popular opinion, and in the 1806 election enough abolitionists entered parliament for Wilberforce to be able to see the passing of the Slave Trade Act 1807. The Royal Navy subsequently declared that the slave trade was equal to piracy, the West Africa Squadron choosing to seize ships involved in the transfer of slaves and liberate the slaves on board, effectively crippling the transatlantic trade. Through abolitionist efforts, popular opinion continued to mount against slavery, and in 1833 slavery itself was outlawed throughout the British Empire (with exceptions) - at that time containing roughly 1/6 of the world's population (rising to 1/4 towards the end of the century).

In the United States, the abolition movement faced much opposition. Bertram Wyatt-Brown notes that the appearance of the Christian abolitionist movement "with its religious ideology alarmed newsmen, politicians, and ordinary citizens. They angrily predicted the endangerment of secular democracy, the mongrelization, as it was called, of white society, and the destruction of the federal union. Speakers at huge rallies and editors of conservative papers in the North denounced these newcomers to radical reform as the same old 'church-and-state' zealots, who tried to shut down post offices, taverns, carriage companies, shops, and other public places on Sundays. Mob violence sometimes ensued."

A postal campaign in 1835 by the American Anti-Slavery Society (AA-SS) - founded by African-American Presbyterian clergyman Theodore S. Wright - sent bundles of tracts and newspapers (over 100,000) to prominent clerical, legal, and political figures throughout the whole country, and culminated in massive demonstrations throughout the North and South. In attempting to stop these mailings, New York Postmaster Samuel L. Gouverneur unsuccessfully requested the AA-SS to cease sending it to the South. He therefore decided that he would "aid in preserving the public peace" by refusing to allow the mails to carry abolition pamphlets to the South himself, with the new Postmaster General Amos Kendall affirming, even though he admitted he had no legal authority to do so. This resulted in the AA-SS resorting to other and clandestine means of dissemination.

Despite such determined opposition, many Methodist, Baptist, and Presbyterian members freed their slaves and sponsored Black congregations, in which many Black ministers encouraged slaves to believe that freedom could be gained during their lifetime. After a great revival occurred in 1801 at Cane Ridge, Kentucky, American Methodists made anti-slavery sentiments a condition of church membership. Abolitionist writings, such as "A Condensed Anti-Slavery Bible Argument" (1845) by George Bourne, and "God Against Slavery" (1857) by George B. Cheever, used the Bible, logic and reason extensively in contending against the institution of slavery, and in particular the chattel form of it as seen in the South.

Other Protestant missionaries of the Great Awakening initially opposed slavery in the South, but by the early decades of the 19th century, many Baptist and Methodist preachers in the South had come to an accommodation with it in order to evangelize the farmers and workers. Disagreements between the newer way of thinking and the old often created schisms within denominations at the time. Differences in views toward slavery resulted in the Baptist and Methodist churches dividing into regional associations by the beginning of the Civil War.

Roman Catholic statements also became increasingly vehement against slavery during this era. In 1741 Pope Benedict XIV condemned the enslavement of indigenous people, unsuccessfully attempting to excommunicate Catholics who enslaved native Brazilians. However, he did not address the enslavement of Black Africans. In 1815 Pope Pius VII demanded of the Congress of Vienna the suppression of the slave trade. In 1839 Pope Gregory XVI condemned the slave trade in In supremo apostolatus. In the 1850 Bull of Canonization of Peter Claver, one of the most illustrious adversaries of slavery, Pope Pius IX branded the "supreme villainy" (summum nefas) of the slave traders. And in 1888 Pope Leo XIII condemned slavery in In plurimis.

Roman Catholic efforts extended to the Americas. The Roman Catholic leader of the Irish in Ireland, Daniel O'Connell, supported the abolition of slavery in the British Empire and in America. With the black abolitionist Charles Lenox Remond, and the temperance priest Theobold Mathew, he organized a petition with 60,000 signatures urging the Irish of the United States to support abolition. O'Connell also spoke in the United States for abolition.

Preceding such, and while not explicitly expressing an abolitionist point of view, the Portuguese Dominican Gaspar da Cruz in 1569 strongly criticized the Portuguese traffic in Chinese slaves, explaining that any arguments by the slave traders that they "legally" purchased already-enslaved children were bogus.

In 1917, the Roman Catholic Church's Canon Law was officially expanded to specify that "selling a human being into slavery or for any other evil purpose" is a crime.

Pope Francis was one of the prominent religious leaders who came together in the Vatican, 2 December 2014, with the aim of eliminating modern slavery and human trafficking. During a ceremony held in the seat of the Pontifical Academy for Sciences in the Vatican they signed a Declaration of Religious Leaders against Slavery. Joining Pope Francis were eminent Orthodox, Anglican, Jewish, Muslim, Buddhist and Hindu representatives. In his address Pope Francis said:

...Inspired by our confessions of faith, we are gathered here today for an historical initiative and to take concrete action: to declare that we will work together to eradicate the terrible scourge of modern slavery in all its forms. The physical, economic, sexual and psychological exploitation of men, women and children that is currently inflicted on tens of millions of people constitutes a form of dehumanization and humiliation. Every human being, man women, boy and girl, is made in God's image. God is the love and freedom that is given in interpersonal relationships, and every human being is a free person destined to live for the good of others in equality and fraternity. Every person, and all people, are equal and must be accorded the same freedom and the same dignity. Any discriminatory relationship that does not respect the fundamental conviction that others are equal is a crime, and frequently an aberrant crime. Therefore, we declare on each and every one of our creeds that modern slavery, in terms of human trafficking, forced labor and prostitution, and organ trafficking, is a crime against humanity...

=== Opposition to abolitionism ===
Passages in the Bible on the use and regulation of slavery have been used throughout history as justification for the keeping of slaves, and for guidance in how it should be done. Therefore, when abolition was proposed, some Christians spoke vociferously against it, citing the Bible's acceptance of slavery as 'proof' that it was part of the normal condition. George Whitefield, famed for his sparking of the Great Awakening of American evangelicalism, campaigned, in the Province of Georgia, for the legalisation of slavery, joining the ranks of the slave owners that he had denounced in his earlier years, while contending they had souls and opposing mistreatment and owners who resisted his evangelism of slaves. Slavery had been outlawed in Georgia, but it was legalised in 1751 due in large part to Whitefield's efforts. He bought enslaved Africans to work on his plantation and the orphanage he established in Georgia. Selina Hastings, Countess of Huntingdon inherited these slaves and kept them in bondage.

In both Europe and the United States, political leaders went further, arguing that slavery was actually justified by the words and doctrines of the Bible.

[Slavery] was established by decree of Almighty God...it is sanctioned in the Bible, in both Testaments, from Genesis to Revelation...it has existed in all ages, has been found among the people of the highest civilization, and in nations of the highest proficiency in the arts.

— Jefferson Davis, President, Confederate States of America

... the right of holding slaves is clearly established in the Holy Scriptures, both by precept and example.

— Richard Furman (1755 – 1825), President, South Carolina Baptist Convention

Historian Claude Clegg writes that at the time of the Second Great Awakening, there was a movement to create a narrative of a mutually beneficial relationship between slaves and masters. This was increasingly tied to the doctrine of the Church as a means of justifying the system of slavery.

In 1837, southerners in the Presbyterian denomination joined forces with conservative northerners to drive the antislavery New School Presbyterians out of the denomination. In 1844, the Methodist Episcopal Church split into northern and southern wings over the issue of slavery. In 1845, the Baptists in the South formed the Southern Baptist Convention due to disputes with Northern Baptists over slavery and missions.

== Slavery in the Americas ==
In the Americas the justification switched from religion (the slaves are heathens) to race (Africans are the descendants of Ham); indeed, in 1667, the Virginian assembly enacted a bill declaring that baptism did not grant freedom to slaves. In 1680, the Spanish colonial government in Florida offered freedom to escaped slaves who made it into the colony and converted to Catholicism. This offer was repeated multiple times. The opposition to the U.S. Civil Rights Movement in the 20th century was founded in part on the same religious ideas that had been used to justify slavery in the 19th century.

Slavery was by no means relegated to the continental United States, as in addition to vast numbers of Native Americans slaves, it is estimated that for every slave who went to North America, South America imported nearly twelve slaves, with the West Indies importing over ten. By 1570, 56,000 inhabitants were of African origin in the Caribbean.

The introduction of Catholic Spanish colonies to the Americas resulted in, indentured servitude and even slavery to the indigenous peoples. Some Portuguese and Spanish explorers were quick to enslave the indigenous peoples encountered in the New World. The Papacy was firmly against this practice. In 1435 Pope Eugene IV issued an attack against slavery in the papal bull Sicut Dudum that included the excommunication of all those who engage in the slave trade. Later In the bull Sublimus Dei (1537), Pope Paul III forbade the enslavement of the indigenous peoples of the Americas (called Indians of the West and the South) and all other people. Paul characterized enslavers as allies of the devil and declared attempts to justify such slavery "null and void".

...The exalted God loved the human race so much that He created man in such a condition that he was not only a sharer in good as are other creatures, but also that he would be able to reach and see face to face the inaccessible and invisible Supreme Good ... Seeing this and envying it, the enemy of the human race, who always opposes all good men so that the race may perish, has thought up a way, unheard of before now, by which he might impede the saving word of God from being preached to the nations. He (Satan) has stirred up some of his allies who, desiring to satisfy their own avarice, are presuming to assert far and wide that the Indians ... be reduced to our service like brute animals, under the pretext that they are lacking the Catholic faith. And they reduce them to slavery, treating them with afflictions they would scarcely use with brute animals ... by our Apostolic Authority decree and declare by these present letters that the same Indians and all other peoples—even though they are outside the faith—... should not be deprived of their liberty ... Rather they are to be able to use and enjoy this liberty and this ownership of property freely and licitly, and are not to be reduced to slavery ...

Many Catholic priests worked against slavery, like Peter Claver and Jesuit priests of the Jesuit Reductions in Brazil and Paraguay. Father Bartolomé de las Casas worked to protect Native Americans from slavery, and later Africans. The Haitian Revolution, which ended French colonial slavery in Haiti, was led by the devout Catholic ex-slave Toussaint L'Overture.

In 1810, Mexican Catholic Priest Father Miguel Hidalgo y Costilla, who is also the Father of the Mexican nation, declared slavery abolished, but it was not official until the War of Independence finished.

In 1888 Brazil became the last country in the Americas to abolish slavery completely, although in 1871 it had ensured that eventual result with the gradualist method of freeing in the womb. See Abolition of slavery timeline for other dates.

=== Indigenous African religions in the United States ===
In the 18th century, slaves came from various African societies, cultures, and nations which existed on the West African coast, such as the Igbo, Ashanti and Yoruba. Slaves who were members of different ethnic groups displayed few religious commonalities, despite the fact that they came from the same continent; those Africans who were sold to American slavers shared little of their traditional cultures and religions.

Igbo, Yoruba, and Ashanti religious practices did not survive in slave communities in the United States. The institution of slavery, with its high conversion rate, ultimately eliminated traditional African religions in the country.

Christianity has existed in Africa for a very long time (most notably in Ethiopia) that some scholars consider it an "indigenous, traditional and African religion", nonetheless, it was a minority faith on the continent as a whole. Most of the slaves who lived in the United States came from the West-African coast, which was far less Christian. As a result, converting slaves to Christianity was common but it remained controversial, with some slave owners resisting conversion because they feared that "slaves seeing themselves as spiritually equal" would spur an abolitionist movement. On the other hand, other slave owners promoted conversion because they thought that Christian slaves would make better workers. While many Americans argued otherwise, an increasing number of citizens and slaves argued that Christian religious principles directly conflicted with the institution of slavery.

Even though these changes occurred in mainstream Christian thinking, many argue that this fact does not imply innocence on the part of Christian religious institutions: Harvard Divinity School's Jacob K. Olupona states that Christianity was "deeply culpable in the African slave trade, inasmuch as it consistently provided a moral cloak for the buying and selling of human beings".

In addition, some missionaries and clergymen wrote about the indifference of masters to their religious welfare. Even for Christian slaves, the actual ability to practice their religion was often impeded: while some slave owners openly encouraged their slaves to hold religious meetings, this was not a universal position across the country. One former slave recalled, "When de niggers go round singin' 'Steal Away to Jesus,' dat mean dere gwine be a 'ligious meetin' dat night. De masters ... didn't like dem 'ligious meetin's so us natcherly slips off at night".

=== United States ===
The first African slaves arrived in Jamestown, Virginia, in 1619, when a Dutch slave trader bartered them for food. These Africans became indentured servants, possessing a legal position similar to many poor Englishmen. It was not until around the 1680s that the popular idea of a racial-based slave system became reality.

Additionally, "New World slavery was a unique conjunction of features. Its use of slaves was strikingly specialized as unfree labor-producing commodities, such as cotton and sugar, for a world market." "By 1850 nearly two-thirds of the plantation slaves were engaged in the production of cotton.... The South was totally transformed by the presences of slavery.

For the most part, the Pilgrims who arrived at Plymouth, Massachusetts, in 1620 had servants and not slaves, meaning that after turning 25 most black servants were given their freedom, which was a contractual arrangement similar to that of English apprenticeships.

Opposition to slavery in the United States predates the nation's independence. As early as 1688, congregations of the Religious Society of Friends (Quakers) actively protested slavery. The Quaker Testimony of Equality would have an influence on slavery in Pennsylvania. However, at independence the nation adopted a Constitution which forbade states from liberating slaves who had fled from other states, and instructed them to return such fugitive slaves.

The rise of abolitionism in 19th-century politics was mirrored in religious debate; slavery among Christians was generally dependent on the attitudes of the community they lived in. This was true in both Protestant and Catholic churches. Religious integrity affected the white slave-holding Christian population. Slaveholders, priests, and those tied to the Church undermined the beliefs of the millions of African-American converts.

As abolitionism gained popularity in the Northern states, it strained relations between Northern and Southern churches. Northern clergy increasingly preached against slavery in the 1830s. In the 1840s, slavery began to divide denominations. This, in turn, weakened social ties between the North and South, allowing the nation to become even more polarized in the 1850s.

The issue of slavery in the United States came to an end with the American Civil War. Although the war began as a political struggle over the preservation of the nation, it took on religious overtones as southern preachers called for a defense of their homeland and northern abolitionists preached the good news of liberation for slaves. Gerrit Smith and William Lloyd Garrison abandoned pacifism, and Garrison changed the motto of The Liberator to Leviticus 25:10, "Proclaim Liberty throughout all the land, and to all the inhabitants thereof." The YMCA joined with other societies to found the United States Christian Commission, with the goal of supporting Union soldiers, and churches collected $6 million for their cause.

Harriet Tubman, who was a liberator with the Underground Railroad, warned "God won't let master Lincoln beat the South till he does the right thing" - i.e., emancipating the slaves. Popular songs such as John Brown's Body (later The Battle Hymn of the Republic) contained verses which painted the Northern war effort as a religious campaign to end slavery. US President Abraham Lincoln, too, appealed to religious sentiments, suggesting in various speeches that God had brought on the war as punishment for slavery, while acknowledging in his second Inaugural Address that both sides "read the same Bible, and pray to the same God; and each invokes His aid against the other."

With the Union victory in the war and a slavery banned by constitutional amendment, abolitionist Christians also declared a religious victory over their slave-holding brethren in the South. Southern religious leaders who had preached a message of divine protection were now left to reconsider their theology.

==== Baptists ====
By the 1830s, tensions had begun to mount between northern and southern Baptist churches. The support of Baptists in the South for slavery can be ascribed to economic and social reasons, although this was never admitted. Instead, it was claimed that slavery was beneficent, and endorsed in the Bible by God. However, Baptists in the North disagreed strongly, claiming that God would not "condone treating one race as superior to another". Southerners, on the other hand, held that God intended the races to be separate. Finally, around 1835, Southern states began complaining that they were being slighted in the allocation of funds for missionary work.

The break occurred in 1844, when the Home Mission Society announced that a person could not be simultaneously both a missionary and a slaveowner. Faced with this challenge, the Baptists in the South assembled in May 1845 in Augusta, Georgia, and organized the Southern Baptist Convention, which was pro-slavery. Throughout the remainder of the 19th century and throughout most of the 20th the Southern Baptist Convention continued to protect systemic racism and opposed civil rights for African-Americans, only officially and definitively renouncing slavery and "racial" discrimination with a resolution in 1995.

William Knibb was an active campaigner against slavery in Jamaica, who suffered persecution, including the burning of his chapel at Falmouth, at the hands of agents of the colonial powers.

A healthy Church kills error, and tears evil in pieces! Not so very long ago our nation tolerated slavery in our colonies. Philanthropists endeavored to destroy slavery, but when was it utterly abolished? It was when Wilberforce roused the Church of God, and when the Church of God addressed herself to the conflict—then she tore the evil thing to pieces!

— C. H. Spurgeon, a prominent Baptist opponent of slavery, 'The Best Warcry'

==== Catholics ====
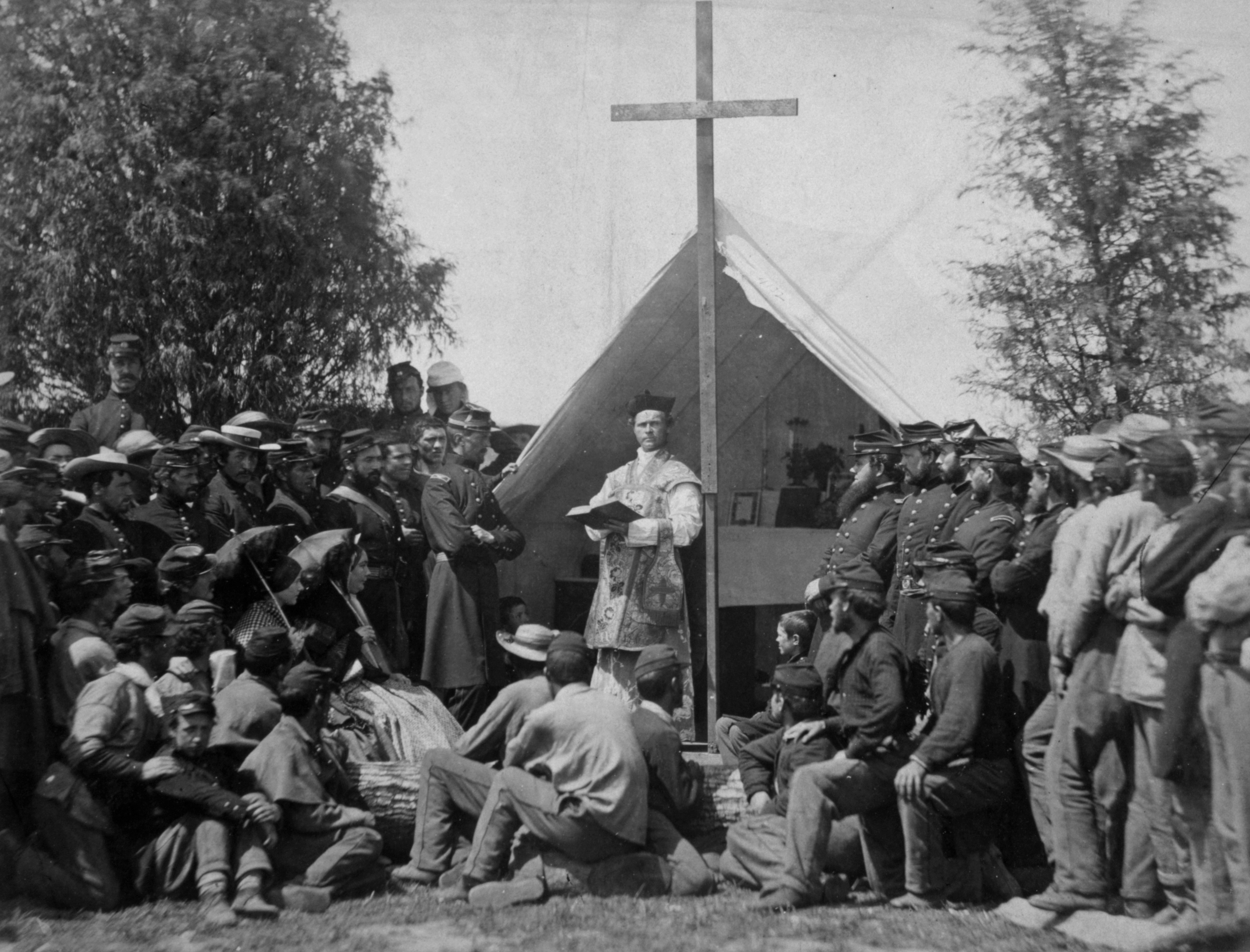
Soldiers from the Irish Brigade attending a Catholic Union army chaplain at a Mass during the American Civil War

Catholic bishops in America were always ambivalent about slavery. Two slaveholding states, Maryland and Louisiana, had large contingents of Catholic residents; however both states had also the largest numbers of former slaves who were freed. Archbishop of Baltimore, Maryland, John Carroll had two black servants - one free and the other a slave. The Society of Jesus in Maryland owned slaves, who worked on their farms. The Jesuits began selling off their slaves in 1837, and without these funds Georgetown University would not exist today; it "owes its existence" to this transaction. As Catholics only started to become a significant part of the US population in the 1840s with the arrival of poor Irish and southern Italian immigrants, who congregated in urban (non-farming) environments, the overwhelming majority of slaveowners in the US were white Protestants, the elite.

In 1839, Pope Gregory XVI issued the Bull In supremo apostolatus condemning the slave trade.

We prohibit and strictly forbid any Ecclesiastic or lay person from presuming to defend as permissible this trade in Blacks under no matter what pretext or excuse, or from publishing or teaching in any manner whatsoever, in public or privately, opinions contrary to what We have set forth in these Apostolic Letters.... [We]... admonish and adjure in the Lord all believers in Christ, of whatsoever condition, that no one hereafter may dare unjustly to molest Indians, Negroes, or other men of this sort; or to spoil them of their goods; or to reduce them to slavery; or to extend help or favour to others who perpetuate such things against them; or to excuse that inhuman trade by which Negroes, as if they were not men, but mere animals, howsoever reduced to slavery, are, without any distinction, contrary to the laws of justice and humanity, bought, sold, and doomed sometimes to the most severe and exhausting labours.

Bishop John England of Charleston wrote several letters to President Martin Van Buren's Secretary of State explaining that the Pope, in In supremo, did not condemn slavery but only the slave trade, the buying and selling of slaves, not the owning of them; no Pope had ever condemned "domestic slavery" as it had existed in the United States. As a result of this interpretation, no American bishop spoke out in favor of abolition.

Daniel O'Connell, the lawyer fighting for Catholic Emancipation in Ireland, supported the abolition of slavery in the British Empire and in America. Garrison recruited him to the cause of American abolitionism. O'Connell, the black abolitionist Charles Lenox Remond, and the temperance priest Theobold Mathew organized a petition with 60,000 signatures urging the Irish of the United States to support abolition. O'Connell also spoke in the United States for abolition. The Bishop of New York denounced O'Connell's petition as a forgery, and if genuine, an unwarranted foreign interference. The Bishop of Charleston declared that, while Catholic tradition opposed slave trading, it had nothing against slavery.

One outspoken critic of slavery, Archbishop John Baptist Purcell of Cincinnati, Ohio, wrote:

When the slave power predominates, religion is nominal. There is no life in it. It is the hard-working laboring man who builds the church, the school house, the orphan asylum, not the slaveholder, as a general rule. Religion flourishes in a slave state only in proportion to its intimacy with a free state, or as it is adjacent to it.

Between 1821 and 1836 when Mexico opened up its territory of Texas to American settlers, many of the settlers had problems bringing slaves into Catholic Mexico (which did not allow slavery).

During the Civil War, Bishop Patrick Neeson Lynch was named by Confederate President Jefferson Davis to be its delegate to the Holy See, which maintained diplomatic relations in the name of the Papal States. Pope Pius IX, as had his predecessors, condemned chattel slavery. Despite Bishop Lynch's mission, and an earlier mission by A. Dudley Mann, the Vatican never recognized the Confederacy, and the Pope received Bishop Lynch only in his ecclesiastical capacity.

William T. Sherman, a prominent General during the Civil War, freed many slaves during his campaigns. George Meade, who defeated Confederacy General Robert E. Lee at the Battle of Gettysburg, was a Catholic.

==== Methodists ====
Methodists believed that the institution of slavery contradicted their strict morality and abolitionist principles. Methodists were long at the forefront of slavery opposition movements. The Christian denomination attempted to help slaves and subsequently freed blacks through philanthropic agencies such as the American Colonization Society and the Mission to the Slaves. It was during the 1780s that American Methodist preachers and religious leaders formally denounced African-American slavery. The founder of Methodism, the Anglican priest John Wesley, believed that "slavery was one of the greatest evils that a Christian should fight". 18th-century and early 19th-century Methodists had anti-slavery sentiments, as well as the moral responsibility to bring an end to African-American Slavery. However, in the United States some members of the Methodist Church owned slaves and the Methodist Church itself split on the issue in 1850, with the Southern Methodist churches actively supporting slavery until after the American Civil War. The Free Methodist Church and Wesleyan Methodist Church strongly opposed the institution of slavery and led the abolitionist movement.

Following Emancipation, African-Americans believed that true freedom was to be found through the communal and nurturing aspects of the Church. The Methodist Church was at the forefront of freed-slave agency in the South. Denominations in the southern states included the African Methodist Episcopal (AME) and African Methodist Episcopal Zion (AMEZ) churches. These institutions were led by blacks that explicitly resisted white charity, believing it would have displayed white supremacy to the black congregations. The AME, AMEZ, and African-American churches throughout the South provided social services such as ordained marriages, baptisms, funerals, communal support, and educational services. Education was highly regarded. Methodists taught former slaves how to read and write, consequently enriching a literate African-American society. Blacks were instructed through Biblical stories and passages. Church buildings became schoolhouses, and funds were raised for teachers and students.

==== Quakers ====
Quakers played a major role in the abolition movement against slavery in both the United Kingdom and in the United States. Quakers were among the first whites to denounce slavery in the American colonies and Europe, and the Society of Friends became the first organization to take a collective stand against both slavery and the slave trade, later spearheading the international and ecumenical campaigns against slavery.

Leading Quakers, including George Fox, began questioning the treatment of slaves in the New World as early as 1671 during a trip to Barbados. On the mainland, American Quakers first openly denounced slavery in 1688, when four German-Dutch Quakers, Francis Daniel Pastorius, Garret Hendericks, Derick op den Graeff and Abraham op den Graeff issued a petition calling for the abolition of the practice from their recently established colony of Germantown, close to Philadelphia in the newly founded Pennsylvania Colony. This action, although seemingly overlooked at the time, ushered in almost a century of active debate among Pennsylvanian Quakers about the morality of slavery which saw energetic antislavery writing and direct action from several Quakers, including William Southeby, John Hepburn, Ralph Sandiford, and Benjamin Lay.

During the 1740s and 1750s, antislavery sentiment took a firmer hold. A new generation of Quakers, including John Woolman and Anthony Benezet, protested against slavery, and demanded that Quaker society cut ties with the slave trade. They were able to carry popular Quaker sentiment with them and, in the 1750s, Pennsylvanian Quakers tightened their rules, by 1758 making it effectively an act of misconduct to engage in slave trading. The London Yearly Meeting soon followed, issuing a "strong minute" against slave trading in 1761. On paper at least, global politics would intervene. The American Revolution would divide Quakers across the Atlantic.

From 1755 to 1776, the Quakers worked at freeing slaves, and became the first Western organization to ban slaveholding.

In the United Kingdom, Quakers would be foremost in the Society for Effecting the Abolition of the Slave Trade in 1787 which, with some setbacks, would be responsible for ensuring the abolition of the slave trade in 1807 and slavery itself throughout the British Empire by 1833. In the United States, Quakers would be less successful. In many instances, it was easier for American Quakers to oppose the slave trade and slave ownership in the abstract than to directly oppose the institution of slavery itself, as it manifested itself in their local communities. While many individual Quakers spoke out against slavery after American independence, local Quaker meetings were often divided on how to respond to slavery; outspoken Quaker abolitionists were sometimes sharply criticized by other Quakers.

Nevertheless, there were local successes for Quaker antislavery in the United States during the late eighteenth and early nineteenth century. For example, the Pennsylvania Abolition Society, first founded in 1775, consisted primarily of Quakers; seven of the ten original white members were Quakers and 17 of the 24 who attended the four meetings held by the Society were Quakers. Throughout the nineteenth century, Quakers increasingly became associated with antislavery activism and antislavery literature: not least through the work of abolitionist Quaker poet John Greenleaf Whittier.

As Quakers began to travel and spread (both geographically and theologically), different groups and individuals came to have varied ideas on slavery and how to act against it.

Quakers were also prominently involved with the Underground Railroad. For example, Levi Coffin started helping runaway slaves as a child in North Carolina. Later in his life, Coffin moved to the Ohio–Indiana area, where he became known as the President of the Underground Railroad. Elias Hicks penned the "Observations on the Slavery of the Africans" in 1811 (2nd ed. 1814), urging the boycott of the products of slave labor. Many families assisted slaves in their travels through the Underground Railroad. Henry Stubbs and his sons helped runaway slaves get across Indiana. The Bundy family operated a station that transported groups of slaves from Belmont to Salem, Ohio.

Quaker antislavery activism could come at some social cost. In the nineteenth-century United States, some Quakers were persecuted by slave owners and were forced to move to the west of the country in an attempt to avoid persecution. Nevertheless, in the main, Quakers have been noted and, very often, praised for their early and continued antislavery activity.

==== Mormonism ====
Mormon scripture simultaneously denounces both slavery and abolitionism in general, teaching that it is not right for men to be in bondage to each other, but it also teaches that one should not interfere with the slaves of others. However, Joseph Smith, the founder of Mormonism, taught that the enslavement of black Africans was required because he believed that they were still under the Curse of Cain and the Curse of Ham and he also warned those who were trying to free the slaves that they were going against the decrees of God. While these justifications were common in America at the time, Mormons canonized several scriptures giving credence to the pro-slavery interpretation of the Curse of Ham and received scriptures teaching against interfering with the slaves of others. While promoting the legality of slavery, the church consistently taught against the abuse of slaves and advocated for laws that provided protection, though critics said the definition of abuse was vague and difficult to enforce. A few slave owners joined the church, and took their slaves with them to Nauvoo.

In Nauvoo, Joseph Smith began expressing a more abolitionist sentiment. While he was running for the presidency of the United States, Smith wrote a political platform containing a plan to abolish slavery. After Smith's death, the church split. The largest contingent followed Brigham Young, who supported slavery but opposed abuse, and a smaller contingent followed Smith's son Joseph Smith III, who opposed slavery. Brigham Young led his contingent to Utah, where he led the efforts to legalize slavery in Utah. Brigham Young taught that slavery was ordained of God and taught that the Republicans' efforts to abolish slavery went against the decrees of God and would eventually fail.

While black slavery was never widespread among Mormons, there were several prominent slave owners in the leadership of the LDS Church, including Abraham O. Smoot and Apostle Charles C. Rich. The LDS Church also accepted slaves as tithing. The Mormon settlement of San Bernardino openly practiced slavery under the leadership of Apostles Charles C. Rich and Amasa M. Lyman, despite being in the free state of California. They were freed by a judge who determined that the slaves were kept ignorant of the laws and their rights.

Brigham Young also encouraged members to participate in the Indian slave trade. While visiting the members in Parowan, he encouraged them to "buy up the Lamanite children as fast as they could". He argued that by doing so, they could educate them and teach them the gospel, and in a few generations the Lamanites would become white and delightsome. Mormons often referred to Indians as Lamanites, reflecting their belief that the Indians were descended from the Lamanites, who were a cursed race discussed in the Book of Mormon. Chief Walkara, one of the main slave traders in the region, was baptized into the church, and he received talking papers from Apostle George A. Smith that wished him success in trading Piede children.

Mormons also enslaved Indian prisoners of war. As they began expanding into Indian territory, they often became embroiled in conflicts with the local residents. After expanding into Utah Valley, Young issued the extermination order against the Timpanogos, resulting in the Battle at Fort Utah, where many Timpanogos women and children were taken into slavery. Some were able to escape, but many died in slavery. After expanding into Parowan, Mormons attacked a group of Indians, killing around 25 men and taking the women and children as slaves.

== Slavery in Asia ==
=== Philippines ===
Spaniards considered it legitimate to enslave non-Christian captives from wars and trade them legally in the past. This is because they did not consider this as an uncivilized and unchristian act because they believed that men were not created equal and the inferior men may be ruled by the superior ones. Christians, however, were anticipated to show sympathy to the people suffering and this made some masters free their slaves. A lot of them apprenticed their slaves so they could still work under their supervision once they were freed. There were two major types of slaves: the esclavos negros who were Africans purchased from Portugal, and the esclavos blancos who were Moros taken from wars. They were usually sold in public auctions. People from both the middle and the upper classes bought them, as well as the clergy.

== See also ==
- Christian abolitionism
- History of slavery
- Slavery and religion
- Slavery in medieval Europe
- The Bible and slavery
- Catholic Church and slavery
