= Christian abolitionism =

Abolitionist movement

Although some Enlightenment philosophers opposed slavery, it was Christian activists, attracted by strong religious elements, who initiated and organized an abolitionist movement. Throughout Europe and the United States, Christians, usually from "un-institutional" Christian faith movements, not directly connected with traditional state churches, or "non-conformist" believers within established churches, were to be found at the forefront of the abolitionist movements.

== Ancient times ==
In the milieu of the New Testament, both Roman administration and Judaic custom and law accepted various forms and degrees of slavery, and Paul, the author of several letters that became part of the New Testament, requests in his letter to Philemon the manumission of a slave named Onesimus, writing: "Perhaps the reason he was separated from you for a little while was that you might have him back forever—no longer as a slave, but better than a slave, as a dear brother" (Philemon 1:15–16). In addition, the Book of Revelation envisages the end of the slave trade (along with much of commerce), suggesting that it involves the marketing of human souls and their bodies as if they were cargo. Other views in Second-Temple Judaism also opposed slavery: according to Philo of Alexandria, the Essenes (a radical Jewish sect in Judaea who rejected much of the institutions of civilization) also rejected slavery, for violating the free equality of man.

In the fourth century, the bishop Gregory of Nyssa articulated a fundamentally Christian conception of the world that embedded a thorough rejection of the notion that one human could be owned by another and a condemnation of the institution of slavery. The historian Kyle Harper writes:

Humans were granted mastery over the animals by God. But in practicing slavery, humans overstepped the boundaries of their appointment. Gregory proceeded to attack slavery by questioning, philosophically, the paradigmatic act of the slave system: the sale. With penetrating insight, he asked how the human being, the rational creation of God, could be given a "price." What, he asked, could have the same market value as human nature? "How much does rationality cost? How many obols for the image of God? How many staters did you get for selling the God-formed man?" Here Gregory offers a logic that was entirely novel in the ancient world but would reverberate in later centuries with tremendous consequence.

== Christian abolitionism in the United Kingdom ==
In particular, the effects of the Second Great Awakening resulted in many evangelicals working to see the theoretical Christian view, that all people are essentially equal, made more of a practical reality. Freedom of expression within the Western world also helped in enabling opportunity to express their position. Prominent among these abolitionists was Parliamentarian William Wilberforce in England, who wrote in his diary when he was 28 that, "God Almighty has set before me two great objects, the suppression of the Slave Trade and Reformation of Morals." With others he labored, despite determined opposition, to finally abolish the British slave trade. Some of the sermons of English preacher Charles Spurgeon were burned in America due to his censure of slavery, where he had called it "the foulest blot" and which "may have to be washed out in blood". Methodist founder John Wesley denounced human bondage as "the sum of all villainies", and detailed its abuses. In Georgia, primitive Methodists united with brethren elsewhere in condemning slavery.

In 1787, the Society for Effecting the Abolition of the Slave Trade was formed, with 9 of the 12 founder members being Quakers. During the same year, William Wilberforce was persuaded to take up their cause; as an MP, Wilberforce was able to introduce a bill to abolish the slave trade. Wilberforce first attempted to abolish the trade in 1791, but could only muster half the necessary votes; however, after transferring his support to the Whigs, it became an election issue. Abolitionist pressure had changed popular opinion, and in the 1806 election enough abolitionists entered parliament for Wilberforce to be able to see the passing of the Slave Trade Act 1807. The Royal Navy subsequently declared that the slave trade was equal to piracy, the West Africa Squadron choosing to seize ships involved in the transfer of slaves and liberate the slaves on board, effectively crippling the transatlantic trade. Through abolitionist efforts, popular opinion continued to mount against slavery, and in 1833 slavery itself was outlawed throughout the British Empire – at that time containing roughly one-sixth of the world's population (rising to a quarter towards the end of the century).

== Quaker abolitionists ==
Quakers in particular were early leaders in abolitionism. In 1688 Dutch Quakers in Germantown, Pennsylvania, sent an antislavery petition to the Monthly Meeting of Quakers. By 1727 British Quakers had expressed their official disapproval of the slave trade. Three Quaker abolitionists, Benjamin Lay, John Woolman, and Anthony Benezet, devoted their lives to the abolitionist effort from the 1730s to the 1760s, with Lay founding the Negro School in 1770, which would serve more than 250 pupils. In June 1783, a petition from the London Yearly Meeting and signed by over 300 Quakers was presented to Parliament protesting the slave trade.

== Christian abolitionism in the United States ==
In the United States, the abolition movement faced much opposition. Bertram Wyatt-Brown notes that the appearance of the Christian abolitionist movement "with its religious ideology alarmed newsmen, politicians, and ordinary citizens. They angrily predicted the endangerment of secular democracy, the mongrelization, as it was called, of white society, and the destruction of the federal union. Speakers at huge rallies and editors of conservative papers in the North denounced these newcomers to radical reform as the same old “church-and-state” zealots, who tried to shut down post offices, taverns, carriage companies, shops, and other public places on Sundays. Mob violence sometimes ensued."

A postal campaign in 1835 by the American Anti-Slavery Society (AA-SS) – founded by African-American Presbyterian clergyman Theodore S. Wright – sent bundles of tracts and newspapers (over 100,000) to prominent clerical, legal, and political figures throughout the whole country, and culminated in massive demonstrations throughout the North and South. In attempting to stop these mailings, New York Postmaster Samuel L. Gouverneur unsuccessfully requested the AA-SS to cease sending it to the South. He therefore decided that he would “aid in preserving the public peace” by refusing to allow the mails to carry abolition pamphlets to the South himself, with the new Postmaster General Amos Kendall affirming, even though he admitted he had no legal authority to do so. This resulted in the AA-SS resorting to other and clandestine means of dissemination.

Many evangelical leaders in the United States such as Presbyterian Charles Finney and Theodore Weld, and women such as Harriet Beecher Stowe (daughter of abolitionist Lyman Beecher) and Sojourner Truth motivated hearers to support abolition. Finney preached that slavery was a moral sin, and so supported its elimination. "I had made up my mind on the question of slavery, and was exceedingly anxious to arouse public attention to the subject. In my prayers and preaching, I so often alluded to slavery, and denounced it. Repentance from slavery was required of souls, once enlightened of the subject, while continued support of the system incurred "the greatest guilt" upon them. Finney clearly stated, "If I do not baptize slavery by some soft and Christian name, if I call it SIN, both consistency and conscience conduct to the inevitable conclusion, that while the sin is persevered in, its perpetrators cannot be fit subjects for Christian communion and fellowship." Finney also conscientiously believed that "the time is not far distant when the churches will be united in this expression of abhorrence against this sin."

Despite such determined opposition, many Methodist, Baptist, Adventist, and Presbyterian members freed their slaves and sponsored black congregations, in which many black ministers encouraged slaves to believe that freedom could be gained during their lifetime. After a great revival occurred in 1801 at Cane Ridge, Kentucky, American Methodists made anti-slavery sentiments a condition of church membership. Abolitionist writings, such as "A Condensed Anti-Slavery Bible Argument" (1845) by George Bourne, and "God Against Slavery" (1857) by George B. Cheever, used the Bible, logic and reason extensively in contending against the institution of slavery, and in particular the chattel form of it as seen in the South. In Cheever's speech entitled, "The Fire and Hammer of God’s Word Against the Sin of Slavery", his desire for eliminating the crime of slaveholding is clear, as he goes so far as to address it to the President.

Other Protestant missionaries of the Great Awakening initially opposed slavery in the South, but by the early decades of the 19th century, many Baptist and Methodist preachers in the South had come to an accommodation with it in order to evangelize the farmers and workers. Disagreements between the newer way of thinking and the old often created schisms within denominations at the time. Differences in views toward slavery resulted in the Baptist and Methodist churches dividing into regional associations by the beginning of the Civil War.

== Catholic abolitionism ==
Roman Catholic statements against slavery also grew increasingly vocal during this era. In 1741, Pope Benedict XIV condemned slavery generally. In 1815, Pope Pius VII demanded the Congress of Vienna to suppress the slave trade. In the Bull of Canonization of Peter Claver, one of the most illustrious adversaries of slavery, Pope Pius IX branded the "supreme villainy" (summum nefas) of the slave traders;

In 1839, Pope Gregory XVI condemned the slave trade in In supremo apostolatus; and in 1888 Pope Leo XIII condemned slavery in In Plurimis.

Roman Catholic efforts extended to the Americas. The Roman Catholic leader of the Irish in Ireland, Daniel O'Connell, supported the abolition of slavery in the British Empire and in America. With the black abolitionist Charles Lenox Remond, and the temperance priest Theobold Mathew, he organized a petition with 60,000 signatures urging the Irish of the United States to support abolition. O'Connell also spoke in the United States for abolition.

Preceding such, and while not explicitly expressing an abolitionist point of view, the Portuguese Dominican Gaspar da Cruz in 1569 strongly criticized the Portuguese traffic in Chinese slaves, explaining that any arguments by the slave traders that they "legally" purchased already-enslaved children were bogus.

In 1917, the Roman Catholic Church's canon law was officially expanded to specify that "selling a human being into slavery or for any other evil purpose" is a crime.
