= William Oland Bourne =

American clergyman, journalist, social reformer (1819–1901)

- Born: November 1, 1819; Germantown, Philadelphia, U.S.
- Died: June 6, 1901 (aged 81); Montclair, New Jersey, U.S.
- Burial place: Green-Wood Cemetery
- Other names: Wm. Oland Bourne; W. O. Bourne
- Occupations: Clergyman; hymnist; publisher; poet; journalist; editor; author; social reformer
- Known for: Disability rights activism
- Father: George Bourne

Readable pdf of The Soldier's Friend

William Oland Bourne (1819–1901) was an American clergyman, publisher, journalist, editor, author, poet, and social reformer. He published The Soldier's Friend, a disabled veteran's newsletter, and The Iron Platform Extra. He is considered a pioneer in disability rights activism. He also used the name Wm. Oland Bourne and W. O. Bourne.

== Early life and family ==
William Oland Bourne was born in 1819, in Germantown in Philadelphia Pennsylvania. Abolitionist Presbyterian minister and author George Bourne and Mary Oland Stibbs Bourne were his parents, and had ten children. His mother Mary Oland Stibbs had immigrated from Bath, Somerset in England, to New Glasgow, Virginia. His father George Bourne immigrated from Westbury, Wiltshire, England and was a noted Presbyterian minister, editor, and considered one of the pioneer of abolitionism in the United States. His brothers, Theodore Bourne (1822–1910), was an author and active in repatriation efforts for African Americans, and Rowland Hill Bourne (1812–1886) was a minister.

When he was 10 years old, his family moved to New York state. He was a close friend of Horace Greeley.

== Career ==
During the American Civil War, Bourne served as a hospital chaplain for the Union Army. Bourne published and edited The Soldier's Friend (also known as Soldier's Friend and Grand Army of the Republic) a newsletter for American Civil War veterans founded in 1864, which included left handed penmanship contests for veterans who had lost their right arms. He was involved with the Workingmen's Democratic Republican Association, and published the related The Iron Platform Extra.

After the death of president Abraham Lincoln on April 15, 1865, Bourne gave a speech at Rev. John Dowling's Berean Baptist Church in Brooklyn, New York City.

Bourne authored an illustrated book of fables, books of poetry and song for children, a history of the Public School Society, and The Sale of a Distillery; a pencilling of the present age, Saxton & Miles (1845) His co-authored the book, The House That Jeff Built (1868) which was a short book of anti-Confederacy verses.

== Death and collections ==
He died on June 6, 1901, in Montclair, New Jersey, and is buried at Green-Wood Cemetery in Brooklyn.

The book The Left–Armed Corps: Writings by Amputee Civil War Veterans (2022) edited by Allison M. Johnson contains references to Bourne. The New York Historical Society & Museum has a collection of his papers. He is included in the Bourne family papers at Yale University's Beinecke Rare Book and Manuscript Library Repository.

== Publications ==
- Bourne, Wm. Oland (1845). The Sale of a Distillery; a Pencilling of the Present Age. New York City, NY: Saxton & Miles.
- Bourne, Wm. Oland (1850). Poems of Hope and Action. New York City, NY: George P. Putnam.
- Bourne, Wm. Oland (1853). Little Silverstring: or, Tales and Poems for the Young. New York City, NY: Charles Scribner.
- Bourne, Wm. Oland (1853). Gems from Fable-Land: a Collection of Fables Illustrated by Facts (3rd ed.). New York City, NY: Charles Scribner.
- Bourne, Wm. Oland (1854). Goldenlink: or, Tales and Poems for the Young. J. W. Orr (engraver). New York City, NY: Charles Scribner.
- Bourne, Wm. Oland (1861). The Republic, A Poem. New York City, NY: Richard Brinkerhoff.
- Bourne, Wm. Oland; Reed, John J. (1868). The House That Jeff Built. New York City, NY: American News Company.
- Bourne, Wm. Oland (1873). History of the Public School Society of the City of New York, with Portraits of the Presidents of the Society. New York City, NY: Geo. P. Putnam's Sons.
- Bourne, Wm. Oland (1881). Now I Lay Me Down to Sleep; the Prayer of Childhood, in Literature and Song. New York City, NY: Anson D.F. Randolph & Company.

== See also ==
- John Greenleaf Whittier
