= George B. Cheever =

American journalist, poet, and abolitionist (1807–1890)

George Barrell Cheever (April 7, 1807 – October 1, 1890) was a well-known and controversial abolitionist minister and writer. Born in Hallowell, Maine, he was an 1825 graduate of Bowdoin College, where he was a classmate of Nathaniel Hawthorne and Henry W. Longfellow, and Andover Theological Seminary. In 1832 he became pastor of the Howard Street Congregational Church in Salem, Massachusetts. In 1838 he became pastor of the Allen Street Presbyterian Church, in New York City, and in 1846 the new Congregational Church of the Puritans. New York City. In 1846 he married Elizabeth Hoppin Wetmore Cheever; they had no children.

He was a leader of the Christian Abolitionist Movement. His best-known works, which went through multiple editions and are held by hundreds of libraries, are:

- God against slavery : and the freedom and the duty of the pulpit to rebuke it, as a sin against God. New York: Joseph R. Ladd. 1857.
- The guilt of slavery and the crime of slaveholding, demonstrated from the Hebrew and Greek scriptures. Boston: John P. Jewett. 1860.

He was also a leader in the American Temperance Society. In 1833, he published:

- "The Temperance Reformation. Fifth Report of the American Temperance Society. Presented at the meeting in Boston, May 1832" in The American Quarterly Observer. July 1833.

Edgar Allan Poe famously remarked on Cheever: "He is much better known, however, as the editor of The Commonplace Book of American Poetry, a work which has at least the merit of not belying its title, and is exceedingly commonplace".
