= George Bourne =

English-born American abolitionist, clergyman (1780–1845)

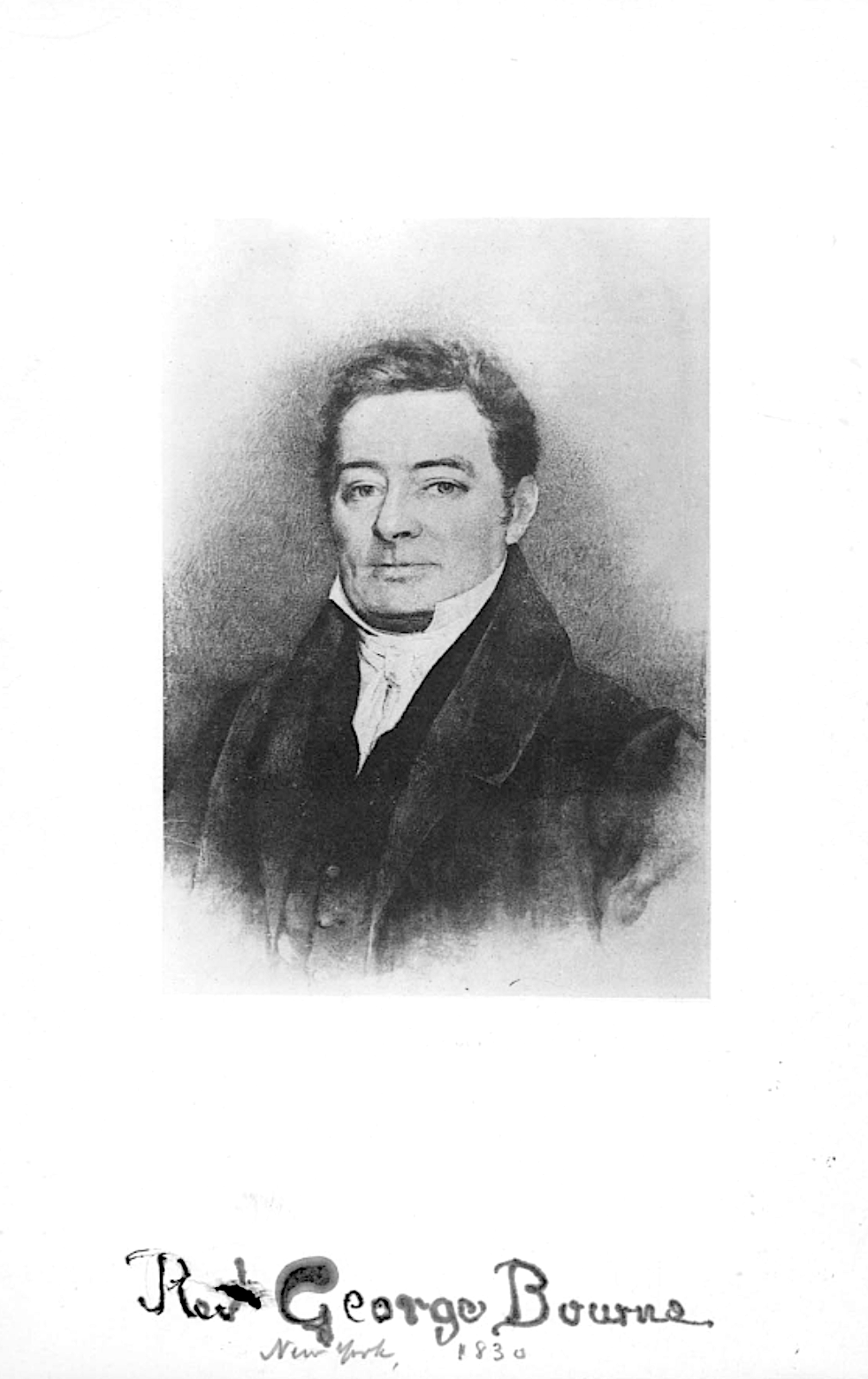
- Born: June 13, 1780; Westbury, Wiltshire, England
- Died: November 20, 1845 (aged 65); New York City, New York, U.S.
- Occupations: Presbyterian minister, abolitionist, journalist, editor
- Known for: Abolitionism in the United States
- Spouse: Mary Oland Stibbs (m. 1804; death 1845)
- Children: 10, including William Oland Bourne

George Bourne (1780–1845) was an English-born American 19th-century abolitionist Presbyterian minister, journalist, and editor, credited as the first public proclaimer of "immediate emancipation without compensation" of American slaves. He is considered one of the pioneers of the anti-slavery movement in the United States.

In 1815, he initiated a controversey in Virginia's Shendoah Valley when he publicly called out fellow Presbyterian enslavers for abusing the people they enslaved, and insisted that the Presbytery must expel all enslavers. In 1816, he wrote and printed at home The Book and Slavery Irreconcilable by a citizen of Virginia. In his journalistic career, he wrote over twenty-two books including biographies of Rev John Wesley and Napoleon Bonaparte. His book on Thomas Jefferson and his presidency has been lost. He was one of the founders of the American Anti-Slavery Society and worked fervently at developing an American Protestant alliance of churches. His Picture of Slavery in the United States of America was published in 1834 and included illustrations of whippings and an auction. He also was the editor of various publications dealing with anti-slavery and poperism, most notably the Christian Intelligencer at the time of his death in New York City on November 20, 1845. Several of his sons were also prominent abolitionists in the United States.

== Ancestry ==
George Bourne descended from an ancestral line embracing some of the names illustrious as martyrs and confessors in the first annals of the Reformation and the era succeeding, and to be early placed under decided religious influences, and among favorable religious associations. His father, Samuel Bourne, was for thirty years a deacon of the Congregational Church at Westbury. His mother was Mary Rogers, a lineal descendant of John Rogers, the Proto-martyr in the reign of persecuting Queen Mary, and who was the gifted translator and editor of the Bible which he published under the nom de plume of "Thomas Matthews", supplementing and completing the work of Tyndale and Coverdale.

His maternal grandmother was Mary Cotton (or Mercy Cotton), daughter of Rowland Cotton, physical doctor of Warminster and preacher at Horningsham, son of Seaborn Cotton and Prudence Wade, who was son of Rev John Cotton, the first Puritan minister of Boston. On his father's side, he reckoned the martyr James Johnston, who suffered death at the Cross of Glasgow, in 1684, in defense of "Covenant and work of Reformation", at the time of the bloody Anglican persecution against the Presbyterians of Scotland.

== Early life ==
Born June 13, 1780, in Westbury, Wiltshire, England, he migrated to New York in 1804 and became the editor and co-owner of the Baltimore Daily Gazette in 1806. In 1810 he moved to Virginia and became a Presbyterian minister.

He studied at the seminary at Homerton, London. Being a staunch nonconformist, and inclined in favor of a republican form of government, he wrote articles which attracted attention, even of the cabinet ministry of that day. He took part in the growing discussions regarding slavery and slave-trade, along with the Wilberforces, Clarksons, Buxtons, and their compeers.

== Marriage ==
In 1802 he paid a visit to the United States to assess the propriety of making it his home for ministerial labors. He wrote "Cursory Remarks of the United States of America" which is in the Library of Congress. He determined to return and settle, believing that greater freedom of conscience and liberty could be enjoyed in the United States than in England. At that time Dissenters were still compelled to use the clergy of the Church of England for certain services.

After his return to England, he married Mary Oland Stibbs of Bath, Somerset. She to belong to the congregation of the Rev William Jay. They were married in St James' Church, Bristol, September 6, 1804, and shortly after sailed for New York. In 1805 he met Thomas Paine at the house of a bookseller in Maiden Lane. Paine confessed his motives for his infamous attacks on Christianity, recently republished in the Christian Advocate. Bourne's first settlement was at Baltimore, where also for some years he edited the Baltimore Daily Gazette.

== A citizen of Virginia, the beginnings of ministry ==
About the year 1809, he removed to New Glasgow, Virginia, and thence to Port Republic, Virginia, where the first Presbyterian church built in that town was erected. He afterward removed to Harrisonburg in Rockingham County, Virginia, where he originated and became Secretary of the Religious Tract Society, and witnessed the system of American slavery. Believing himself ordained to preach the truth, he denounced the evils of slavery publicly and privately. His steadfast opposition to slavery was a constant offense to enslavers, including his fellow ministers, who determined to drive him out of Virginia. Presbytery leaders of Lexington, Virginia put him on trial for denouncing their continued enslavement of African Americans, and Bourne's criticisms of an especially harsh enslaver.

== Censorship by the Presbyterian Church ==
In 1815, he presented an overture to the General Assembly raising the question of whether Presbyterians who owned slaves could be Christians. The Assembly refused to act. Upon his return home to Harrisonburg, his presbytery voted his deposition from the ministry, i.e., de-frocking: removal from the ministry, sometimes known as "the right boot of fellowship."

In 1816, he published The Book and Slavery Irreconcilable, the most critical American anti-slavery book of its day. The theological importance of the book was that Bourne identified slaveholding as a sin. In his protest in 1815, he cited I Timothy 1:10, which links whoremongers and man-stealers. The Westminster Larger Catechism (1647) cites this verse (A. 142) in listing crimes against the Ten Commandments. This document has been one of the three official standards of American Presbyterianism from its formation in 1720.

The 1816 General Assembly retroactively removed this reference from his protest on procedural grounds. The reason for this was that the revision in the Church's Constitution (1806) had added a detailed critique of man-stealing, but this passage had never been affirmed by two-thirds of the presbyteries, as required by church law. This meant that the passage was not legally binding in a Presbyterian court. The General Assembly, whenever it specifically convenes as a court to hear a case, is the church's supreme court.

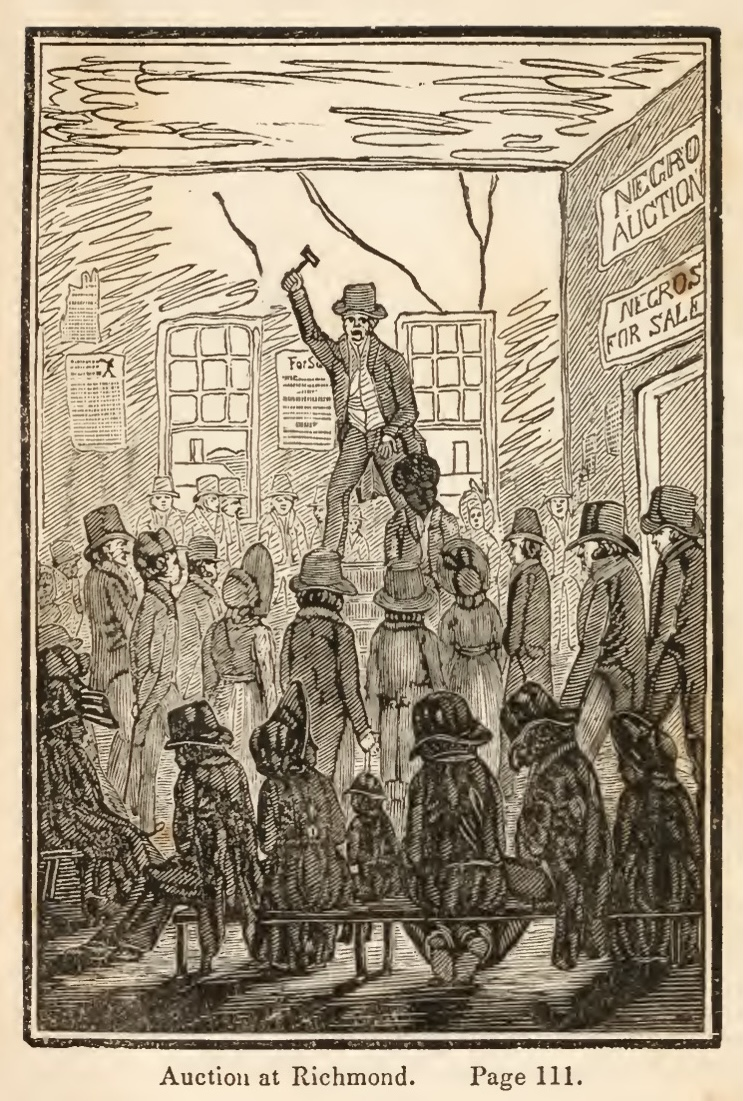
Illustration from Bourne's book Picture of Slavery in the United States of America

Part of the passage read: "The word he [Paul] uses in its original import, comprehends all who are concerned in bringing any of the human race into slavery, or in detaining them in it. . . . Stealers of men are all those who bring off slaves or freemen, and keep, sell, or buy them. To steal a freeman, says Grotius, is the highest kind of theft." This note was eliminated in editions of the Constitution published after 1816.

This undercut Bourne's protest, for the Bible's man-stealing passage and the 1806 statement had been the central pillars of his formal protest and his book. He appealed again in 1817. The General Assembly delayed making a decision. In 1818, the General Assembly upheld his presbytery's decision to de-frock him. This decision locked the largest Presbyterian denomination into official theological neutrality on the slave issue until 1866.

== The Book and Slavery Irreconcilable ==
The book became a model for its style of denouncing the evils of slavery which became so noted in the armory of Garrison and his friend, Wendell Phillips, and others.

== Congregational Church and Lower Canada ==
About the year 1824 he was called from Mount Pleasant or Sing Sing Academy to take charge of the Congregational Church just commenced at Quebec, Canada, of which he was the first pastor.

== Ministry and Teachings ==
"Several ably written accounts of the rise, progress and history of antislavery conflict in America have been published, but for lack of data covering the earlier presentations of that form of Antislavery known as "abolition without compensation," or "immediate abolition," they have failed to account for its origin. They have not explained why there was so great a change from the spirit and method of the advocates of emancipation of the era following the Revolution. It is fully time, therefore, that the persistent advocate of the doctrine of "immediate abolition without compensation," the originator of the American Antislavery Society and conflict, should be duly noticed, more especially as it will relieve the Churches from the apprehension that the contest originated with opponents of Christianity."

=== Character and abilities ===
Bourne was one of the most indefatigable students and workers of his day. He was scarcely ever without pen and paper, or book, in hand, even at his meals. In addition to the constant demand on him for matter for his paper, he was incessantly preparing articles, and preparing books for the press, for the Harpers, the Appletons, and other publishers. Very few men surpassed him in the variety and extent of his literary acquirements. To great mathematical knowledge he added large attainments in philological lore, and as a linguist he ranked high.

His proficiency in the Hebrew language was shown in his preparation of the English-Hebrew portion of Roy's Hebrew Lexicon. It was said of him that he was a living concordance, gazetteer, Bible dictionary, etc. His general style of preaching was extempore and incisive. Multitudes thronged to hear him wherever he was announced to speak upon these topics. Rev Dr W C Brownlee was wont to say, "There are two men to whose preaching he always listened to with delight-Rev Dr Alexander and George Bourne."

Among the books of which he was the author are the following, in addition to those referred to: Picture of Quebec, Old Friends, The Reformers, Lorette, the History of a Canadian Nun; American Textbook of Popery, and Illustrations of Popery. It was the result of forty years of study. It is the concentrated information derived from over seven hundred volumes of writings of the most noted doctors, bishops, deans, cardinals, saints, and popes of the Romish Antichurch, and of the Greek, Oriental, and English Church, and of the "Fathers" and historians of the first four centuries. It contains a chronological table

By his Picture of Slavery, and by his labors among the Methodist Churches, North, he aroused many of the Northern preachers to that enthusiasm for liberty which culminated in the division of the M E Church.

The Southern Churches regarded Bourne as an agitator, a firebrand, a disturber of their peace, and the Northern proslavery ministers and presses opposed and calumniated him with much vigor.

He was for some years acting editor of the Christian Intelligencer, the organ of the Reformed Dutch Church. On the afternoon of November 20, 1845, he died.

=== Funeral services ===
The funeral services were held in the Middle Dutch Church, 23 November. Rev Thomas De Witt, in the course of his remarks, said of him, that like as was said of John Knox, the Scottish Reformer, "There lies one who never feared the face of man." To use the language of another, who ardently loved him—Lewis Tappan:

"Thus has fallen an intrepid advocate of human rights, with his harness on, in a vigorous old age, after a life of singular health, activity, and usefulness. His death is a severe loss to the Antislavery cause, the cause of Protestant Christianity, and the Republic of Letter."

== Opinion of peers ==
=== Testimony by William Lloyd Garrison ===
As it has been so long taken for granted that Mr. Garrison was the originator and prime leader of the Antislavery conflict, I will, before giving a sketch of The Pioneer of "Antislavery" in America, present to the public a copy of a letter addressed to the writer by Mr. Garrison in 1858. It was written currente calamo, in answer to the writer of the African Civilization Society, "to promote the Christian civilization of Africa," and "the cultivation of cotton there by free labor." In this panegyric Mr. Garrison renders ample testimony to the friend and preceptor from whom he derived his doctrines, his enthusiasm, and who animated his courage for his lifelong work of abolition.

William Lloyd Garrison letters to Theodore Bourne about his father George Bourne

"Boston, Nov. 18, 1858. I confess my early and large indebtedness to him for enabling me to apprehend, with irresistible clearness, the inherent patibility with the spirit and precepts of Christianity. I felt and was inspired by the magnetism of his lion-hearted soul, which knew nothing of fear, and trampled upon all compromises with oppression, yet was full of womanly gentleness and susceptibility; and mightily did he aid the Antislavery cause in its earliest states by his advocacy of the doctrine of immediate and unconditional emancipation, his exposure of the hypocrisy of the Colonization Scheme, and his reprobation of a "Negro-hating, slaving-holding religion." He was both a "sun of thunder," and "a son of consolation." Never has slavery had a more indomitable foe or freedom a truer friend.

==== William Lloyd Garrison ====
"You inquire whether you father was not the author of the work entitled Slavery Illustrated in its Effects upon Woman, published in this city, in 1837, by Isaac Knapp. He was, as every line of it bears witness. I wish it could be republished and a million copies of it be distributed broadcast…

Yours to break every yoke,

Wm Lloyd Garrison to Theodore Bourne."

=== New York and the publication of The Protestant ===
While other champions have arisen who have done valiantly for the Church of Christ against Rome, to him belongs the credit of taking the early lead in the conflict against the Papacy in the United States. Having thoroughly investigated the system in Canada, he beheld with alarm the prospect of its growth in the United States, from the European immigration which commenced to increase in volume about the year 1828. He determined to return to New York and make it his special duty to withstand the inroads of Romanism, and arouse the attention of American Christians to the true character and design of the Papacy, and to the dangers which would environ the Republic should Popism gain ascendancy. With this design he removed to New York in October 1828, and on the first day of January 1830, he commenced the publication of The Protestant, the first Journal published in America devoted to the antipapal controversy.

=== Raising the standard of Protestantism, 1830 ===
When he raised the standard of Protestantism, in 1830 in New York, there was no "Protestant Society", no "Christian Alliance" or "Christian Union", to stand behind and encourage him.

=== Protestant Reformation Society ===
He was the originator of the Protestant Reformation Society, which led to other associations, the Christian Alliance being one of them; these after a time united, and were merged into the American and Foreign Christian Union.

Dr W C Brownless became his principal coadjutor, and the Protestant Vindicator succeeded to the Protestant, which maintained the controversy for some years longer. But he did not forget his animosity to slavery; he was equally devoted to the destruction of that iniquitous system, and as a result of his labors, coupled with those of Garrison, who had established the Liberator in Boston, in 1831, the American Antislavery Society was formed. Thereafter his attention was divided between the two foes of the Republic and of a pure Christianity.

=== Opposition to slavery sprang from within the Churches ===
Under the title of "Picture of Slavery in the United States", he published his former work originally printed in Virginia. "The Book and Slavery Irreconcilable," adding largely to it from his personal recollections of the system and its evils, and illustrated with pictures of scenes that had occurred under his notice there. He also published "Slavery Illustrated in its Effect upon Woman," depicting the terrible social evils resulting from the complex features of Southern society, and the laws regulating slavery.

=== National Antislavery Society ===
At a meeting of delegates to form a National Antislavery Society convened at Philadelphia, December 4, 1833, it was resolved "That George Bourne, William Lloyd Garrison, and Charles W Dennison, be a committee to prepare a synopsis of Wesley's Thoughts on Slavery, and of the Antislavery items in the note formerly existing in the Catechism of the Presbyterian Church of the United States; and of such other similar testimony as they can obtain, to be addressed to Methodists, Presbyterians, and all professed Christians in this country, and published under the sanction of this convention."

In conformity with that appointment the committee selected from the records of the Presbyterian Church every article of general interest which adverts to this momentous subject. This they published under the title of Presbyterianism and Slavery. They also published, under the title of Methodist Discipline, with every thing material in the tract of John Wesley respecting slavery.

These, with other valuable articles, appear as an "Appendix" to the Picture of Slavery, and afford important aid to those who seek for information upon those topics.

=== Antislavery Riots in New York, 1834 ===
The antislavery controversy in New York and elsewhere occasioned riots and violence. A doctrine of "compensated emancipation" was presented as an option. Some believed that no moral suasion or offered compensation could have removed the curse of slavery, and that it was useless to speculate on "what might have been" —we know what was, and what has been— and that perhaps Divine Justice required the awful retribution of blood for blood. In this view it would seem that his eminent servant of God was conscious of a mission, that he could not avoid the duty allotted to him, and that his courage, fidelity, and intrepidity were bestowed upon him to enable him to discharge the task. A striking instance of his courage was admiringly related by the late Thomas Downing and by Dr Henry Highland Garnet, as occurring during the Antislavery riots in New York about the year 1834:

An Antislavery meeting was held at Broadway Hall, in Broadway, above Howard Street, next to the famous Tattersalls. That large, quaint building stood gable end to the street, and its sloping roof descended just below the side windows of the hall of the meeting. Among other noted speakers Mr Garrison was present; while the exercises were progressing, an onslaught was made upon the meeting by the "plug-uglies," and other ruffians, sworn to exterminate the Abolition fanatics. Armed with sticks and clubs, and with a furious noise, they rushed upon the terrified audience, aiming particularly, however, at the rostrum and the speakers. Mr Garrison was safely got away through one of the side windows. George Bourne stood forth to receive the "Tammany Braves," and placing his cane before him with hands extended he said, "Stand back, ye villains! What do you want here? Stand back I say!" The leaders and the advancing band stood still for a moment in astonishment and mute admiration of the courage of the burly looking "dominie," whose splendid physique and fearless eye showed them an undaunted foe. At last one of them swung his hat and cried out "Three cheers for the dominie!" which they gave with a will, and leaving him unmolested, they chased out the remainder of the audience, who were glad to escape without personal violence.

Garrison, the special object of their venom, escaped unharmed.

=== Dutch Reformed Church of New York ===
Shortly after his return to New York from Canada, Bourne united with the Reformed (Dutch) Classis of New York, of which he continued a member until his death. His first pastoral charge in New York was in Provost-Street, (now Franklin) afterward at Huston and Forsyth Streets, and subsequently at West Farms, but most of his time was devoted to the controversy against Popism and slavery.

He edited and had republished many of the controversial works of the sixteenth and following centuries. Among others William Fulke's Confutation of the Rheims Bible; Richard Baxter's Key for Catholics or Jesuit Juggling; Scipio DeRicci's Female Convents; the Secreta Monita of the Jesuits; Taxatio Papalis; History of the Waldenses; Conyers Middleton's Letter from Rome; Martin Luther On the Galatians; John Davenant on Colossians; Archibald Bower's History of the Popes; and other works.

Various biographies of the early 20th century U.S. antiwar socialist Greenwich Village radical Randolph Bourne, mention a grandfather on his father, Charles Bourne's side, who was a famous abolitionist, a pastor at Sleepy Hollow, and a writer.

Randolph Bourne's great-grandfather was Rev George Bourne. His grandfather was Rev Theodore Bourne, the writer of the above extracts. George Bourne was a pastor at Sing Sing Academy in Mount Pleasant, Sleepy Hollow County, New York, where Theodore Bourne was born.

Other family members of the Bourne family that worked for the abolition of slavery were Stephen Bourne, Special Magistrate to Jamaica, Stephen's son, Henry Richard Fox Bourne, Samuel Bourne of Antiqua, Christopher S Bourne, Dr George M Bourne; Rev Rowland Hill Bourne, and Rev Theodore Bourne.

== Sources ==
- Bourne, Theodore (1882). Rev. George Bourne, the pioneer of American antislavery.
