= Freducci map =

Italian map of the Atlantic, early 16th cent

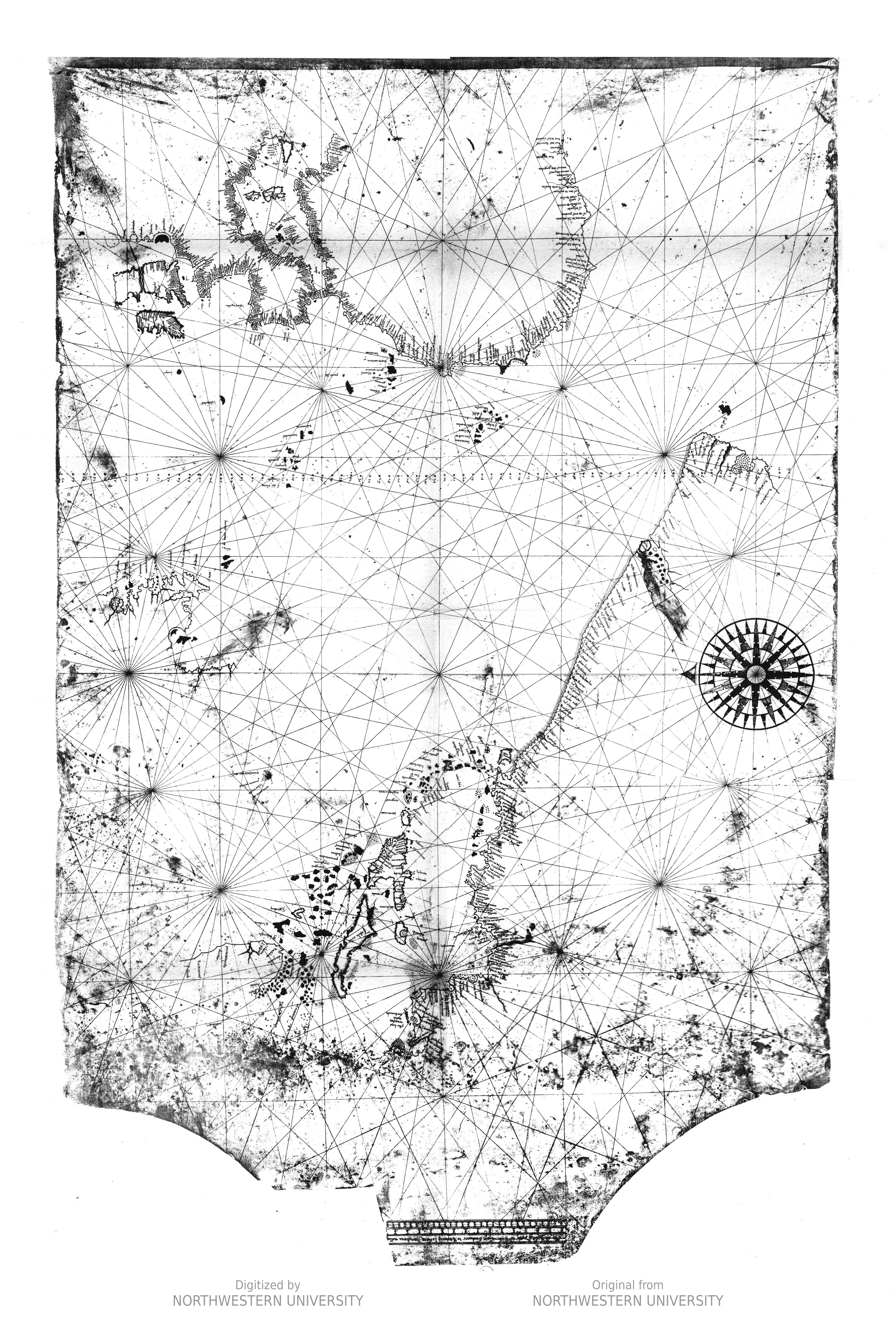
- Freducci map / 1894 facsimile by Casanova / via HathiTrust

General
- Type: Portolan chart
- Date: 1514–1515 or first half 16th cent
- Attribution: Conte di Ottomanno Freducci

Details
- Drafted: Ancona, 1514–1515 / traditional; Ancona, first half 16th cent / possible
- Drafter: Conte di Ottomanno Freducci
- Location: Archivio di Stato di Firenze
- Medium: multichrome ink and pigment on parchment
- Dimensions: 43.7 × 29.9 in (1110 × 760 mm)
- Coverage: Atlantic
- Known for: Earliest map of Florida / disputed; Early non-Amerindian map of Bay of Honduras

The Freducci map is an Italian portolan chart of the Atlantic Ocean depicting portions of both the Old and New Worlds, drafted in Ancona in 1514–1515 or in the first half of the 16th century by Conte di Ottomanno Freducci. It is regarded as the earliest map of Florida, and one of the earliest non-Amerindian maps of northern Central America. It is now held at the Archivio di Stato di Firenze in Florence.

== Background ==
Details of the map's creation are not certain, other than that it was signed by Conte di Ottomanno Freducci in Ancona sometime during the first half of the 16th century. The map, thought to have been held 'for a long time' in the private archives of the Istituto de' Bardi, was in 1891 deposited in the public Archivio di Stato di Firenze. It was first brought to scholarly attention by Eugenio Casanova's 1894 monograph, La carta nautica. (Note: Casanova first presented his work as a thesis in 1892 at the Istituto di Studi Superiori di Firenze (Casanova 1894, preface, paras. 1, 4).)

== Contents ==
Freducci map detail / Bay of Honduras centre, part of south-east Cuba top right (green), west Jamaica mid right (red) / via ASF

Freducci map detail / Tordesillas meridian over Azores, latitudes 36º N to 46º N marked / via ASF

Freducci map detail / legend with signature (black) and two scales (red) / via ASF

The map encompasses parts of both the Old and New Worlds. Of the former is included Western Europe (from Gdańsk to Naples) and Africa (from Ras Amusa, in Tripolitania, to the Bight of Benin, on the Slave Coast). Of the New World are (imperfectly) charted the Atlantic coasts of North and South America between 50º N and 15º S, approximately (from Newfoundland to rio da bestrelas, past Porto Seguro, Bahía).

Toponyms are written in black, except where they were deemed to be of greater importance, in which case they were marked in vermilion ink. (Note: The New World places marked in red are – p. de todos stos, tuguraga, dariem, retrecta, benagua, cavo de graba dios (Casanova 1894, p. 5).)

The map features a 32-wind compass rose, a windrose network with a central ring of 16 vertices, two scales on a legend (no indication of the unit of measurement), and a rectilinear series of small numbered discs (through the Azores, along the Tordesillas meridian) marking the latitudes from 60º N to 15º S. The map is signed in the legend, but the date marked therein has been shorn off, and therefore lost.

== Analysis ==
=== Dating ===
Since damage to the parchment has resulted in loss of the map's date, it has taken a bit of work to infer one. Casanova proposed to date the map by inference from extrinsic and intrinsic characteristics. Among the former is the map's author, whose birth and death would place lower and upper bounds on the map's date of creation. Among the intrinsic factors are the geographical features charted and toponyms marked in the map, which would place a lower bound before which the map could not have been created. (Note: That is, say feature x is charted on the map. Then, if feature x were discovered in year y, the map cannot have been created before year y ie before the feature's discovery. Note, however, that if news of said discovery reached the mapmaker in year y + z, it is not necessarily the case that z = 0 ie Freducci may have learnt of the discovery much later than when it was made. Furthermore, while it may be easy to determine the most recent discovery charted on the map, it is not equally simple to determine the interval it took for the news of it to reach the mapmaker, nor how long after learning of the news Freducci waited to chart it (Casanova 1894, p. 8).)

Freducci lived from the last quarter of the 15th to the first half of the 16th centuries, and was active as a cartographer at least during 1497–1539. One of his relatives, Angelo Freducci, produced an atlas in 1556 whose New World coastlines closely match those of this map. Casanova deems it more likely that Angelo copied Freducci rather than vice versa, thus accepting 1556 as the upper bound for the map's creation. The 1513 Ponce de Leon discovery of Florida is the latest one evident in the map, with the 1513 Balboa discovery of the Gulf of San Miguel being the earliest one omitted, according to Casanova. (Note: Earlier evident discoveries, per Casanova, include the 1508–1509 Solis–Pinzon discovery of coastline from Honduras to Rio Colorado and the 1508 Ocampo discovery of Cape San Antonio (Casanova 1894, p. 14). Later omitted discoveries, per Casanova, include the 1516 Badajoz discovery of coastline between Darien and Nombre de Dios, 1516 Miruelo discovery of coastline west of Apalachee Bay, 1517 Córdoba and 1518 Grijalva discoveries of Yucatán, and 1519 Pineda discovery of the Gulf of Mexico (Casanova 1894, pp. 12–14).) Assuming news of these discoveries did not take too long in reaching Freducci, Casanova proffers a creation date in 1513–1516 as acceptable, with one in 1514–1515 as probable. (Note: Dated ca 1514 in Gaspar 2015, p. 10, (Tilton 1993, p. 33). Peck 2003, p. 101 notes the map 'is generally dated to 1514 or 1515.')

Recently, some scholarship has pushed the map's probable creation date past 1515, however. For instance, of the 19 toponyms in and about Florida, Peck traces only six of them back to the 1513 Ponce de Leon voyage, noting that the remaining 13 'can easily be traced to much later voyages and later cartography.' Similarly, Peck identifies in the map geographical features of Florida which were not discovered until after 1513, like Lake Okeechobee, the St Lucie River, the Thousand Islands, and Cape Canaveral. Some historians also contend that the delineation of Newfoundland on the map is post-1519, and the toponyms are after about 1525.

=== Distortion ===
New World coasts and features in the northern hemisphere are shifted a number of degrees north from their true location, with an even greater northerly shift than that in contemporaneous maps. For instance, the portos de las igueas in the Bay of Honduras is placed at 28º 15' N, despite contemporaries placing it at 14º 30' N and 15º 30' N. Similarly, cavo de graba dios is laid at 21º N, whereas others placed it at 13º 30' N, 14º N, and 15º N. In contrast, New World coasts and features in the southern hemisphere are shifted some degrees south from their true position.

Additional non-shift distortions evident in the map include scaling. For instance, the Antilles are enlarged by a factor of circa 1.65 relative to Europe.

=== Scale ===
The map's legend provides two scales, but does not indicate a unit of measurement. Casanova, with reference to the latitudes marked at the Tordesillas meridian, assuming each such degree spans 111,111 metres, calculates 1:12,044,444 and 1:6,260,106 for the coarser and finer scales provided in the legend, respectively. He further opines that the Old World was charted to the finer scale, and the New World to the coarser one.

=== Sources ===
Casanova argues that the New World portion of the map was not copied from a single source chart, but rather compiled from a myriad such sources. For instance, while the Newfoundland portion of the map is 'exactly similar, point for point,' to that of the 1529 Ribero map, the Florida and Cuba portions are not, both being rather unique for the period. (Note: For Florida, Casanova notes that its form 'has no correspondence with any of the [contemporaneous] maps known so far [by 1894]; and we have to delve down to the second half of the 16th century to find it [a similar form] in the charts of Mercator[; i]n fact, in the first quarter of the 16th century we see that this peninsula [Florida] is commonly given the shape of a figure terminated by straight lines, and never the parabolic shape which Freducci gives her' (Casanova 1894, p. 37). For Cuba, he notes that its form is similar 'only in part' to the Ribero map and others, but that its inclination, on the other hand, 'is not the same as that of any other map' except the 1513 Waldseemuller one (Casanova 1894, p. 37).)

Furthermore, Casanova deems Spanish charts, rather than Portuguese ones, as generally the more influential sources evident in the New World portion of the Freducci map. For instance, the mainland Central and South American coastlines on the Caribbean follow the 'much more exact' Spanish rather than Portuguese maps of the period. (Note: The Spanish maps Casanova had in mind being the 1511 Peter Martyr map, Oliveriana–Pesaro map, da Vinci globe, among others, all 'entirely derived, in [Casanova's] opinion, from the charts of the fourth Columbian voyage, a chart which Bartholomew Columbus drafted together with his brother Christopher and which was then modified and perfected with the voyages of Ojeda, Bastidas, Solis and Pinzon' (Casanova 1894, p. 39).)

=== Toponyms ===
The map's New World toponyms are notably 'very copious and in many parts completely new.' More than three quarters of these are drawn from Spanish sources, with fewer than one quarter of them from Portuguese ones. Most placenames were not written proximally to the place they name, however, and some were even misspelt or otherwise corrupted. (Note: For instance, rio das gramas for rio das gamas, J. florda for Florida, portos de las igueas for de las higueras, cavo de caçinon for de Caxines, costa de la crela for de la oreja, cavo de graba dios for Cape Gracias a Dios, benagua for beragua, and so on (Casanova 1894, p. 50).)

== Legacy ==
Casanova deemed the map 'among the most notable cartographic treasures discovered in recent years.' It is regarded as the earliest map to depict Florida, and one of the earliest to depict 'a coastline west of Hispaniola that is recognisable as part of Central America.' (Note: Tilton 1993, p. 33 lists the Egerton maps, Martyr map, Freducci map, and Homem–Reineis atlas as the earliest to depict northern Central America, further noting that the coastline was generally charted up to 'a latitude roughly equivalent to Hispaniola's [ie within 17º 30' N to 20º N].') It has been studied 'by a considerable number of scholars.'

== Tables ==
=== Toponyms ===
Select New World toponyms of the Freducci map. (Note: This table includes some placenames which Casanova located. Continental toponyms are listed from north to south. 'Tierra Firme' in the Area column refers to Central and South America. Toponyms in the Variants column were compiled by Casanova from a sample of 24 maps (Casanova 1894, pp. 55–56).)
Area	Name	Place	Variants
Newfoundland	y.^{a} de fuego	Fogo Island	illa do fuoco, y.^{a} del fuego, y. del fuego
Newfoundland	y.^{a} de becaliab	Baccalieu Island	rivo de los bacalaos, y. dos bacalhas, i. baccalauras, bachalnao, bachagaos, y. de bacallaos, y.^{a} de bacalaos, i. dos bacalhaos, y.^{a} de bacaliab
Newfoundland	balia de concepçam	Conception Bay	b. da comceicã, cabo de cõcepicion, baia de cocecam, a baia de concipcion, a cõçeiçã, balia de concepçam
Newfoundland	c^{o} raxo	Cape Race	c. rasso, c. raxo, c.^{o} raso, cabo rrasso, c^{o} raxa
Florida	I. florda	Florida	isla florida, terra florida, tera florida, la florida
Tierra Firme	portos de las igueas	Cabo de las Higueras (Note: Tilton 1993, pp. 32–36 locates this cape somewhere on the coast of Belize or southern Quintana Roo.)	cabo de las fegues, p. de higuera, p. de las higueras, r. de las higeras
Tierra Firme	gran baia de navidat	Amatique Bay	la navidad, a baia de navida, gran baia de navidal
Tierra Firme	baia de s. tome	Bahía de Santo Tomás	baia de san tome
Tierra Firme	baia de sagua	Xagua	baia de sagua
Tierra Firme	cavo de la fondura	Cabo Honduras	la fondura, c. la fondura, c. de hondura santa, c. de la fondura
Tierra Firme	Rio verde	Sico River	rio verde
Tierra Firme	Rio primero	Patuca River	rio primero
Tierra Firme	cavo de graba dios	Cape Gracias a Dios	gracias a dios, c.^{o} de gracias a dios, c. gracia dios, c. de gracias a dios, cavo de granba dios
Tierra Firme	coro borro	Carabaro	coroboro, caroboro, y. de cerebaro, carabaro, cornoborro
Tierra Firme	vebra	Belén River	vebra
Tierra Firme	benagua	Veragua	veragua, beragua, beragna, beraga, baliraga
Tierra Firme	retrecta	Puerto del Retrete	p. retrete, retrote
Tierra Firme	dariem	Darien	tariene, dariem, darien, el darien, darem, demen
Tierra Firme	rio salado	Gulf of Urabá	rio salado
Tierra Firme	gudego	Codego	codego, gudego
Tierra Firme	caramari	Calamari	caramari
Tierra Firme	porto cartaçena	Cartagena	cartayenia, p. di cartagena, cartagena, p. de cartajena, p. cartagena
Tierra Firme	Rio grande	Magdalena River	rio grande, rio nando, r. grande
Tierra Firme	s. marta	Santa Marta	s. marta, santa marta, scã marta
Tierra Firme	yrna	Isla Orna	yrna, irna
Tierra Firme	seturnia	Seturnia	seturnia
Tierra Firme	c.^{o} de vela	Cabo de la Vela	c. de la bela, c. de la vela, c. del vera, cabo de la vela, la vela, c. la vela, cavo la vela
Tierra Firme	coquibacua	Gulf of Venezuela	coquibacoa, cochibachoa, coquibacha, comquivacoa, coquibacua
Tierra Firme	veneçuela	Venezuela	venecuela, g. de venetia, vencarella, veneçuela, g. de veneçuala, venerçuola
Tierra Firme	c.^{o} de isleo	Cape San Román	de lisleo, cavo de illeo, lixleo, cavo de isleo
Tierra Firme	coriana	Coro	coro, coriana, cora, quriana

== See also ==
- Weimar map, 15th century map attributed to Freducci
- Egerton 2803 maps, early map depicting Central America
- Suma de Geographia, early pilot's manual to New World

== Notes and references ==
=== Full citations ===
1. Casanova E (1894). La carta nautica di Conte di Ottomanno Freducci d'Ancona conservata nel R. Archivio di stato Firenze. Firenze: Tip. di G. Carnesecchi e figli. hdl:2027/ien.35556000974097. OCLC 4818427. This article incorporates text from this source, which is in the public domain.
2. Denucé J (1910). "The Discovery of the North Coast of South America According to an Anonymous Map in the British Museum". Geographical Journal. 36 (1): 65–80. Bibcode:1910GeogJ..36...65D. doi:10.2307/1777655. JSTOR 1777655.
3. Gaspar JA (2015). "The Representation of the West Indies in Early Iberian Cartography: A Cartometric Approach". Terrae Incognitae. 47 (1): 10–32. doi:10.1179/0082288415Z.00000000041. S2CID 128885931.
4. Klein F (2016). "Carte nautiche, secc. XIV-XVII". Progetto Archivi Digitalizzati (Digitised manuscripts). Firenze: Archivio di Stato di Firenze.
5. Milanich JT, Milanich NB (1996). "Revisiting the Freducci Map: A Description of Juan Ponce DeLeon's 1513 Florida Voyage?". Florida Historical Quarterly. 74 (3): 319–328. JSTOR 30148850.
6. Peck DT (2001). "The Depiction of Florida on the Early Conte Ottomano Freducci Map". Portolan. 50: 24–27. ISSN 1096-1925.
7. Peck DT (2003). "The First European Charting of Florida and the Adjacent Shores". Florida Geographer. 34: 82–113. ISSN 0739-0041.
8. Tilton DW (1989). "Yucatán on the Peter Martyr Map?". Terrae Incognitae. 21 (1): 17–26. doi:10.1179/tin.1989.21.1.17.
9. Tilton DW (1993). "Latitudes, Errors and the Northern Limit of the 1508 Pinzón and Solís Voyage". Terrae Incognitae. 25 (1): 25–40. doi:10.1179/tin.1993.25.1.25.
10. Turner S (2020). "Antón Alaminos, Juan Ponce de León and a 1513-1514 European Discovery of Mexico". Florida Historical Quarterly. 99 (1/2): 1–52. JSTOR 27139406.
