= Peter Martyr map =

Spanish map of the Caribbean, 1511 or 1514

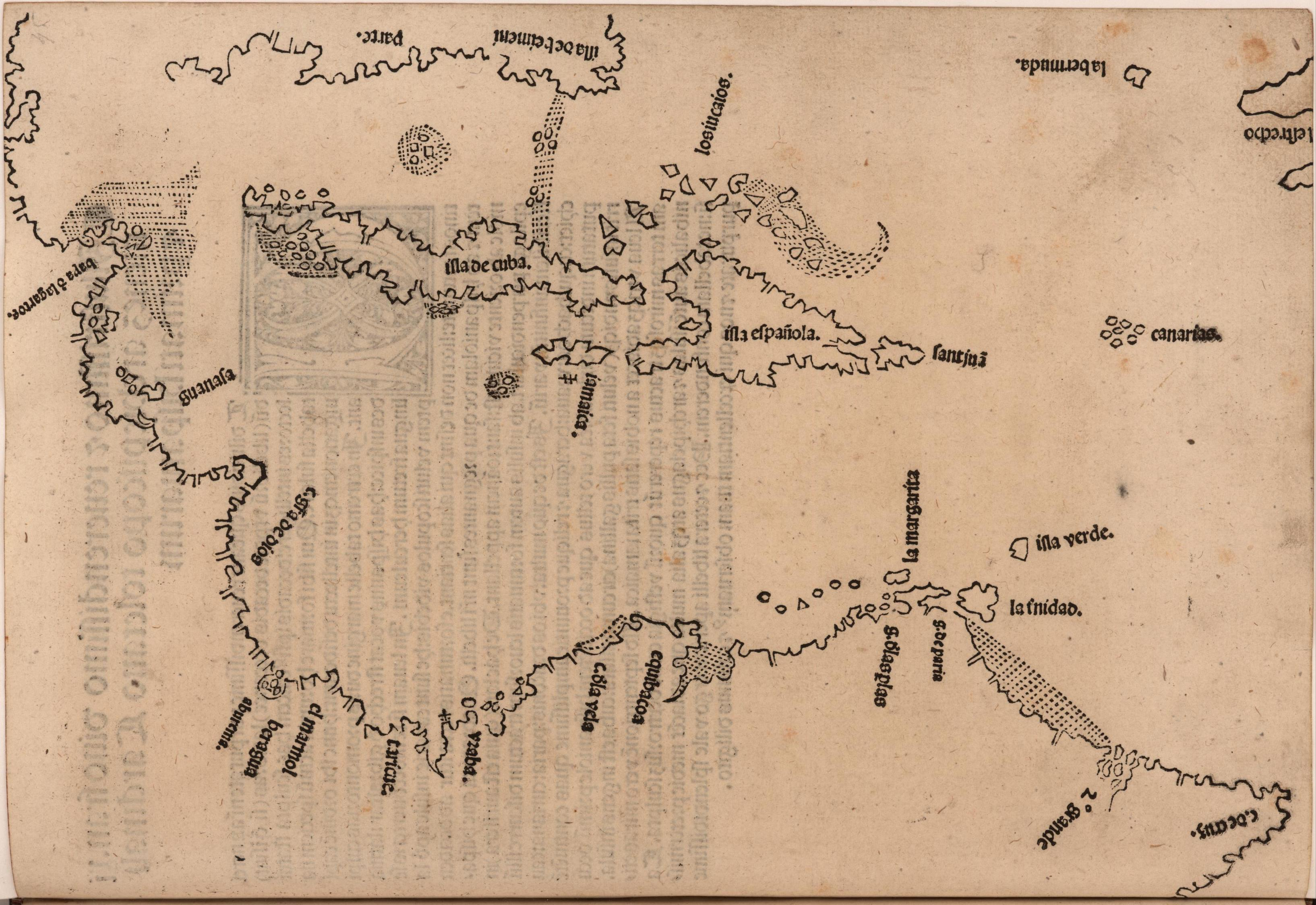
- Peter Martyr map / cropped exemplar / via JCB

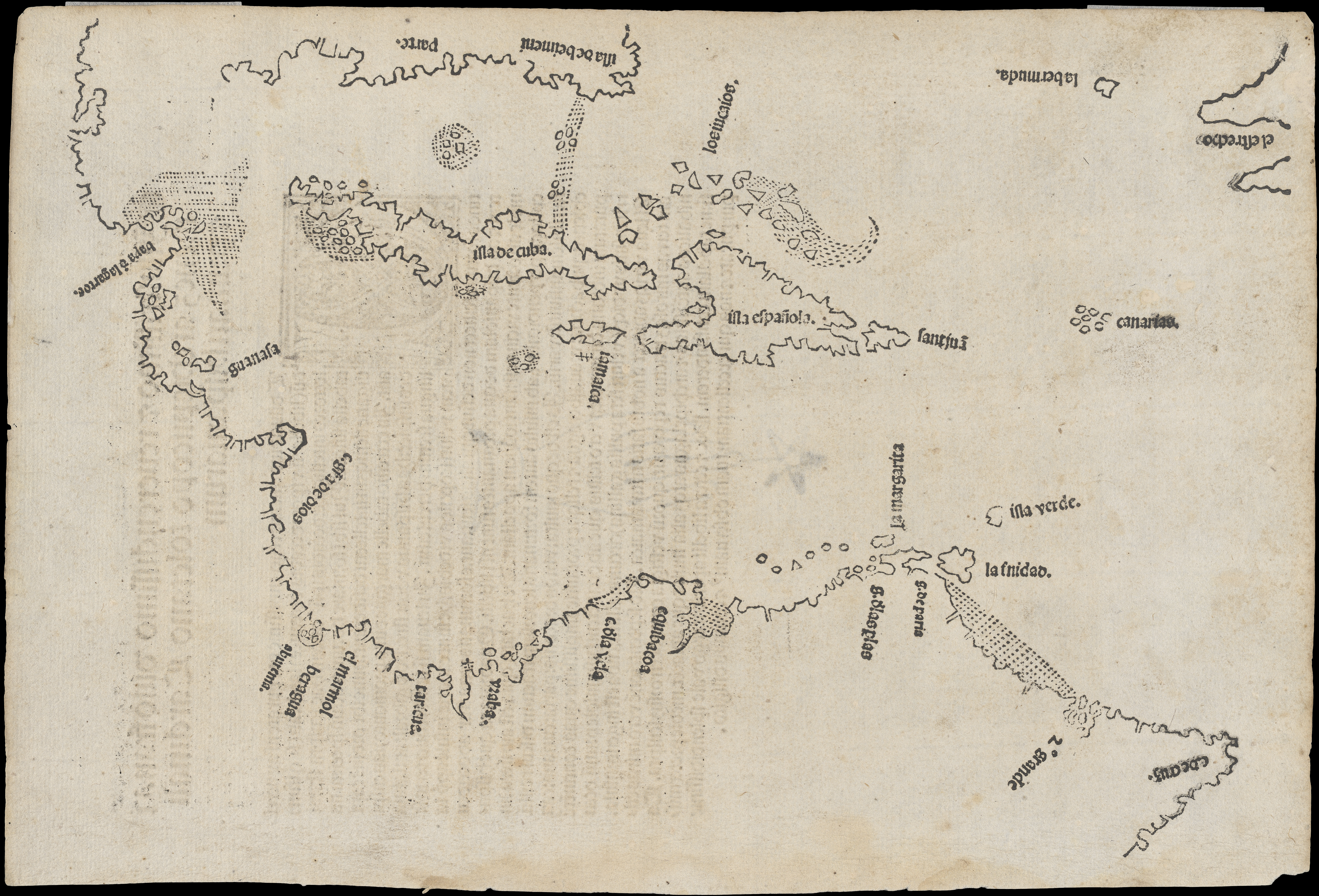
- Peter Martyr map / uncropped exemplar / via USM

General
- Type: nautical chart
- Date: 1511 or 1514
- Attribution: Peter Martyr d'Anghiera

Details
- Drafted: Seville, 1511 / traditional; Seville, 4 Dec 1514 / proposed
- Drafter: Andrés de Morales / traditional; Martyr & Juan de Fonseca / proposed
- Published: Seville, 1511 / traditional; Seville, 1514–1522 / proposed
- Publisher: Peter Martyr
- Printer: Jacobo Cronberger / presumed
- Location: most or some copies of 1511 edition of Decades of the New World
- Medium: wood engraving on parchment
- Dimensions: 10 3/4 × 7 9/10 in (27 1/3 × 20 cm)
- Coverage: Caribbean
- Known for: First print map specifically devoted to the Americas / possible; First print map of the Caribbean; First print map to name Bermuda; First print map of the Yucatán Peninsula / possible

The Peter Martyr map is a Spanish woodcut map composed in 1511 or 1514 and included in most or some copies of the 1511 edition of Decades of the New World by Peter Martyr d'Anghiera. The map depicts the insular and continental Caribbean coastlines and soundings as understood in the early 1510s by Iberian authorities. It is deemed the first print map of the Caribbean, and possibly the first such to focus specifically on the New World.

== History ==
Details of the map's provenance remain unclear, though a good few theories have been proposed. (Note: Camelo & Escandón 2012, p. 173, fn. 33 notes Joseph H Sinclair 'says that this map is attributed to Nuño García de Toreno and must have been drafted in Seville.' Varela Marcos 2005, p. 148 notes the professor Ramos Pérez dates the map's drafting to prior to the 1513 Ponce de León voyage to Florida, while Ramón Ezquerra Abadía dates it to 1511. Peck 2003, pp. 94–95 notes '[m]ost of the published works on early cartography' deem Andrés Morales as the map's drafter, but Peck themselves deem this an error, noting that Morales 'was one of the lesser experienced and travelled pilots of the period.' Conti 2011, p. 44 notes Cerezo Martínez suggests the map 'is a schematic copy of the first Padrón Real, prepared at the Casa de Contratación in 1510 by Amerigo Vespucci with the help of the Sevillian Nuño García de Toreno,' though Conti 2011, pp. 43–44 themselves suggest Morales as the drafter.) Traditionally, it has been dated to 1511 and attributed to Martyr, in keeping with the provenance of the first edition of Decades of the New World. (Note: Martyr's first decade, covering 1490s and 1500s discoveries, is thought to have been written in 1493–1494, 1500–1501, and 1510, and published in April 1511 (Camelo & Escandón 2012, pp. 172–173, 183). His second and third decades were written in late 1513 to late 1515, published in November 1516 (Camelo & Escandón 2012, pp. 174–175) His remaining decades were intermittently written in late 1517 to late 1524, and posthumously anthologised with the previous decades in 1530 as the completed Decades (Camelo & Escandón 2012, pp. 175–182, 185).) Recently, however, the University of Valladolid-affiliated scholar, Jesús Varela Marcos, has proposed that the map was created jointly by Martyr and Juan Rodríguez de Fonseca in 1514, and thereafter included a posteriori in copies of the former's 1511 edition of Decades. Varela Marcos argues that the map's noticeable distortion is political in nature, and proffers Fonseca as the most likely candidate for said influence. (Note: Varela Marcos had prior proposed Fonseca as a political influence during the drafting of the 1500 Juan de la Cosa map, depicting the New World as then discovered (Varela Marcos 2005, p. 150).) Furthermore, they argue, (i) the map depicts post-1511 discoveries, (ii) some exemplars of the 1511 Decades have no map, and (iii) at least some exemplars with the map have had it inserted at a later date. (Note: Examining the Biblioteca de la Catedral de Palencia copy, call number XXIII-IV-17, Varela Marcos noted, '[t]he book was set in two distinct types, and the leaf on which the map was found had been inserted subsequently[; t]his visual analysis offers us the solution that this book had been bound on distinct dates' (Varela Marcos 2005, p. 151). Decades 1511 edition examplars without the map include the Institución Colombina copy, call number 10-3-3(2), among others; exemplars with the map include Wellcome Trust copy, call number 7208/D, the University of Salamanca copy, call number BGH 31200(1), among others. Harrisse 1866, pp. 122–126 and Harrisse 1872, pp. 54–56 describe the Decades 's first edition.) The Varela Marcos provenance has been accepted in some, but not all, recent literature. (Note: For instance, in Meinecke 2019, p. 86 and León Cázares 2015, p. 57, fn. 20, but not in Camelo & Escandón 2012, p. 173, fn. 33 nor Conti 2011, pp. 42, 44 nor Woodward 2007, p. 756, 1148. Peck 2003, p. 95, dating the map to 1511, notes Martyr 'was not limited to the discoveries of official crown voyages, but could picture on his map all of the discoveries including those from unofficial, unreported, and often illegal voyages of unnamed pilots.')

Curiously, Varela Marcos claims the following Decades passage, describing a map-making session by Martyr and Fonseca, in fact describes a 4 December 1514 session in which the very Peter Martyr map was composed.

[W]e examined numerous reports of those expeditions, and we have likewise studied the terrestrial globe on which the discoveries are indicated, and also many parchments, called by the explorers navigators' charts. [...] When all these maps were spread out before us, and upon each a scale was marked in the Spanish fashion, [...] we set to work to measure the coasts with a compass, [...].

— Martyr in Decades. (Note: In his second decade, tenth book, translated by Francis A MacNutt in MacNutt 1912a, pp. 271–272. Also quoted in Meinecke 2019, p. 86, Varela Marcos 2005, p. 149. MacNutt 1912b, p. 247 and Peck 2003, p. 94 further interpret a later short phrase as a Martyr reference to the map, namely, '[b]y studying a little parchment map I gave to your representative, Tomaso Maino, when he left Spain, you will also find the exact positions of these countries and the dependent islands' (seventh decade, first book).)

== Content ==
The map makes note of maritime hazards, such as banks and reefs, and further outlines known insular and continental coasts, listing some placenames near these, but lacks elementary cartographic elements, such as lines of longitude and latitude, and is noticeably distorted. The distortion is particularly along the y-axis. For instance, Gibraltar, Bermuda, and Isla de beimeni are depicted on roughly the same latitude, despite actually being at 37º, 32º, and 25º (assuming Florida as beimeni) north, respectively. Similarly, the Canary Islands, Hispaniola, and Puerto Rico are depicted at roughly the same parallel, despite being at 28º, 18º, 17º north, respectively.

=== Toponyms ===
Toponyms in the Peter Martyr map. (Note: In Meinecke 2019, p. 85 and Varela Marcos 2005, p. 147. Suma toponyms in Fernández de Enciso 1519, ff 66v–75v. León Cázares 2015, p. 64 deems the Suma a 'portrait of the New World as it was perceived in early 1517.')
Toponym	Suma	Place	Note
baya d' lagartos	–	in Yucatán or in Honduras	unlabelled arrecife Alacranes to north or Honduran banks
guanasa	–	in Honduras	in Bay Islands or to east of them
c. gr'a de dios	Cabo d' gracias a dios	Cape Gracias a Dios	–
aburema	–	–	–
beragua	Veragua	–	–
el mármol	–	–	–
taricue	–	–	–
vraba	golfo de Uraba	–	–
c. d' la vela	cabo dela Vela	–	–
equibacoa	cabo de Coquibacoa	–	–
g. d' las p'las	–	–	–
g. de paria	golfo de paria	–	–
rº grande	–	–	–
c. de cruz	cabo de Cruz	–	–
isla de cuba	isla de Cuba	Cuba	–
los iucaios	islas de los Yucayos	The Bahamas	–
iamaica	isla de Jamayca	Jamaica	unlabelled bajos las Víboras to southeast
isla española	isla española	Hispaniola	–
Sant juã	isla d' sant Juã	Puerto Rico	–
la bermuda	–	Bermuda	–
canarias	las [islas] de canaria	Canary Islands	–
la margarita	la isla Margarita	–	–
isla verde	–	–	–
la t'nidad	isla dela trinidad	Trinidad	–
[ill] Isla de beimeni parte, [estr]echo	–	Florida or fictitious	–
el estrecho	–	Strait of Gibraltar	–

== Analysis ==
=== Sources ===
Martyr, in virtue of his 'privileged position' within the court of the Catholic Monarchs, is thought to have been privy to current discoveries of the day, and to classified intelligence therefrom, via, for instance, personal debriefings from leading explorers. Varela Marcos has recently claimed the following Decades passage, listing sources employed during a map-making session by Martyr and Fonseca, in fact names the very sources of the Peter Martyr map.

[W]e examined numerous reports of those expeditions, and we have likewise studied the terrestrial globe on which the discoveries are indicated, and also many parchments, called by the explorers navigators' charts. One of these maps had been drawn by the Portuguese, and it is claimed that Amerigo Vespucci of Florence assisted in its composition. [...] Columbus, during his lifetime, began another map while exploring these regions, and his brother, Bartholomew Columbus, Adelantado of Hispaniola, who has also sailed along these coasts, [added what he saw fit to it]. From thenceforth, every Spaniard who thought he understood the science of computing measurements, has drawn his own map; the most valuable of these maps are those made by the famous Juan de la Cosa, companion of Hojeda, [... and] Andrés Morales [...].

— Martyr in Decades. (Note: In his second decade, tenth book, translated by Francis A MacNutt in MacNutt 1912a, pp. 271–272. Also quoted in Meinecke 2019, p. 86, Varela Marcos 2005, pp. 154–155.)

Possible sources of the Peter Martyr map. (Note: In Meinecke 2019, p. 85, Camelo & Escandón 2012, p. 188, Varela Marcos 2005, pp. 154–156.)
Source	Via	Note
Spanish explorers	nautical chart	–
Portuguese explorers	nautical chart	possibly including Vespucci
Columbus and brother	nautical chart, debriefing	–
Juan de la Cosa	nautical chart	possibly the 1500 Juan de la Cosa map
Andrés de Morales	nautical chart	–
Vicente Yáñez Pinzón	debriefing	post-Pinzón–Solís voyage
Martín Fernández de Enciso	debriefing	–
Juan Ponce de León	nautical chart	post-Florida discovery

=== Content ===
Peck correction of the Peter Martyr map / fig 4 in Peck 2003 / via Commons

Commenting on the map's noticeable distortion, Jesús Varela Marcos suggests Fonseca, the bishop of Burgos, may have requested or required it 'in order to highlight clearly that what was shown on the map was within the area of natural expansion of Spain.' In a 2005 paper for The Florida Geographer, the unaffiliated scholar Douglas T Peck proposed a correction of the northwestern portion of the map which shifted the western continental coastline down by some six degrees. (Note: Peck 2003, p. 97 suggests the error was introduced during the map's drafting, via a misalignment of source maps. Tilton 1993, pp. 25, 28, 32 suggests it was introduced during the source maps' drafting, as dead reckoning introduced 'substantial error due to magnetic variation and the difficulty in measuring speed accurately,' such that 'latitudes would be raised several [some four to six] degrees to the north.')

== Legacy ==
Copies of the Peter Martyr map 'have long been separated from their parent document and have been reproduced extensively in studies and popular literature on early cartography.'

== See also ==
- Cantino map, ca 1502 Portuguese world map
- Caveri map, ca 1504 Genoese world map
- Waldseemüller map, ca 1507 German world map
- Egerton 2803 maps, ca 1508 or ca 1510 Italian world atlas

== Notes and references ==
=== Full citations ===
1. Camelo R, Escandón P, eds. (2012). La creación de una imagen propria: la tradición española: Historiografía civil. Historiografía mexicana. Vol. II Pt 1. México: Universidad Nacional Autónoma de México. ISBN 978-607-02-3388-3.
2. Conti S (2011). "El cuarto viaje de Colon y las primeras posesiones españolas en Tierra Firme según algunos mapas del siglo XVI". Revista de estudios colombinos. 7: 35–48. ISSN 1699-3926.
3. Criado de Val M, ed. (1989). Literatura hispánica, Reyes Católicos y descubrimiento: actas del Congreso Internacional sobre literatura hispánica en la época de los Reyes Católicos y el descubrimiento. Barcelona: Promociones y Publicaciones Universitarias. ISBN 84-7665-515-0.
4. Cro S (2003). "La Princeps y la cuestión del plagio del De Orbe Novo". Cuadernos para investigación de la literatura hispánica. 28: 15–240. ISSN 0210-0061.
5. Fernández de Enciso M (1519). Suma de geographia, q[ue] trata de todas las partidas & prouincias del mundo: en especial de las indias: & trata largame[n]te del arte del marear: juntame[n]te con la espera en roma[n]ce: con el regimie[n]to del sol & del norte: nueuamente hecha (1st ed.). Jacobo Cronberger: Seville. LCCN 02008361.
6. Harrisse H (1866). Bibliotheca Americana Vetustissima: A Description of Works Relating to America Published Between the Years 1492 and 1551. New York: Geo P Philes. OL 7108867M. GB qoJWAAAAcAAJ.
7. Harrisse H (1872). Bibliotheca Americana Vetustissima: A Description of Works Relating to America Published Between the Years 1492 and 1551: Additions. Paris: Librairie Truss. OL 23288471M. GB LSlZAAAAcAAJ.
8. Hernández C (5 November 2018). "Early European Cartography of the Gulf, 16th century". Howard–Tilton Memorial Library Online Exhibits. New Orleans, Louisiana: Tulane University. Archived from the original on 10 September 2023.
9. León Cázares MC (2015). "Nuevas luces sobre un antiguo testimonio acerca de los mayas: el informe de la expedicón comandada por Juan de Grijalva". Estudios de Cultura Maya. 45: 49–89. doi:10.19130/iifl.ecm.2015.45.133 (inactive 12 July 2025). ISSN 0185-2574.
10. MacNutt FA, ed. (1912a). De Orbe Novo: The Eight Decades of Peter Martyr D'Anghera. Vol. 1. New York and London: G. P. Putnam's Sons. OL 772647W.
11. MacNutt FA, ed. (1912b). De Orbe Novo: The Eight Decades of Peter Martyr D'Anghera. Vol. 2. New York and London: G. P. Putnam's Sons. OL 772647W.
12. Meinecke EB (4 February 2019). Naufragios en el seno mexicano: el pecio Ancla Macuca, Yucatán, Golfo de México (MA Thesis). Cádiz, España: Universidad de Cádiz.
13. Olaya VG (25 October 2021). "El misterioso robo y falsificación del primer mapa del Caribe". El País. Madrid.
14. Peck DT (May 2003). "The First European Charting of Florida and the Adjacent Shores". Florida Geographer. 34: 82–114. ISSN 0739-0041.
15. Polo Martín B (25 October 2016). "¿Cuándo y cuál fue el verdadero Padrón Real?". Biblio3W. 21 (1.176): 1–24. doi:10.1344/b3w.0.2016.26365 (inactive 12 July 2025).
16. Tilton DW (1989). "Yucatán on the Peter Martyr Map?". Terrae Incognitae. 21 (1): 17–26. doi:10.1179/tin.1989.21.1.17.
17. Tilton DW (1993). "Latitudes, Errors and the Northern Limit of the 1508 Pinzón and Solís Voyage". Terrae Incognitae. 25: 25–40. doi:10.1179/tin.1993.25.1.25.
18. Varela Marcos J (Autumn 2005). "Las costas mexicanas en el primer mapa impreso de América". Revista de humanidades: Tecnológico de Monterrey. 19: 145–168. ISSN 1405-4167.
19. Wagner HR (October 1947). "Peter Martyr and His Works". Proceedings of the American Antiquarian Society. 56 (2): 239–288. ISSN 0044-751X. Archived from the original on 16 September 2023.
20. Woodward D, ed. (2007). Cartography in the European Renaissance. The History of Cartography. Vol. 3 Pt 1. Chicago & London: University of Chicago Press. ISBN 978-0-226-90733-8.
