= Pinzona =

Scientific classification
- Kingdom: Plantae
- Clade: Tracheophytes
- Clade: Angiosperms
- Clade: Eudicots
- Order: Dilleniales
- Family: Dilleniaceae
- Genus: Pinzona; Mart. & Zucc.

Synonyms
- Calinea bentegeati Walp. & Duchass. ex Eichler; Curatella coriacea (Mart. & Zucc.) Benoist; Doliocarpus belizensis Lundell; Doliocarpus calineoides (Eichler) Gilg; Doliocarpus coriacea (Mart. & Zucc.) Gilg; Doliocarpus nicaraguensis Standl.; Pinzona calineoides Eichler

Species of flowering plant

Pinzona is a monotypic genus of flowering plants belonging to the family Dilleniaceae. It only contains one known species, Pinzona coriacea Mart. & Zucc.

Its native range is Tropical America. It is found in Belize, Bolivia, Brazil (northern), Colombia, Costa Rica, Dominican Republic, Ecuador, French Guiana, Guyana, Honduras, the Leeward Islands, Nicaragua, Panamá, Peru, Suriname, Trinidad-Tobago, Venezuela and the Windward Islands.

The genus name of Pinzona is in honour of Vicente Yáñez Pinzón (c. 1462 – after 1514), a Spanish navigator and explorer, the youngest of the Pinzón brothers. Along with his older brother, Martín Alonso Pinzón (c. 1441 – c. 1493), who captained the Pinta, he sailed with Christopher Columbus on the first voyage to the New World, in 1492, as captain of the Niña. The Latin specific epithet of coriacea means leather-like from corium. Both the genus and the species were first described and published in Abh. Math.-Phys. Cl. Königl. Bayer. Akad. Wiss. Vol.1 on page 371 (1829-1830, published in 1832).
