= Visconte Maggiolo =

Genoese cartographer

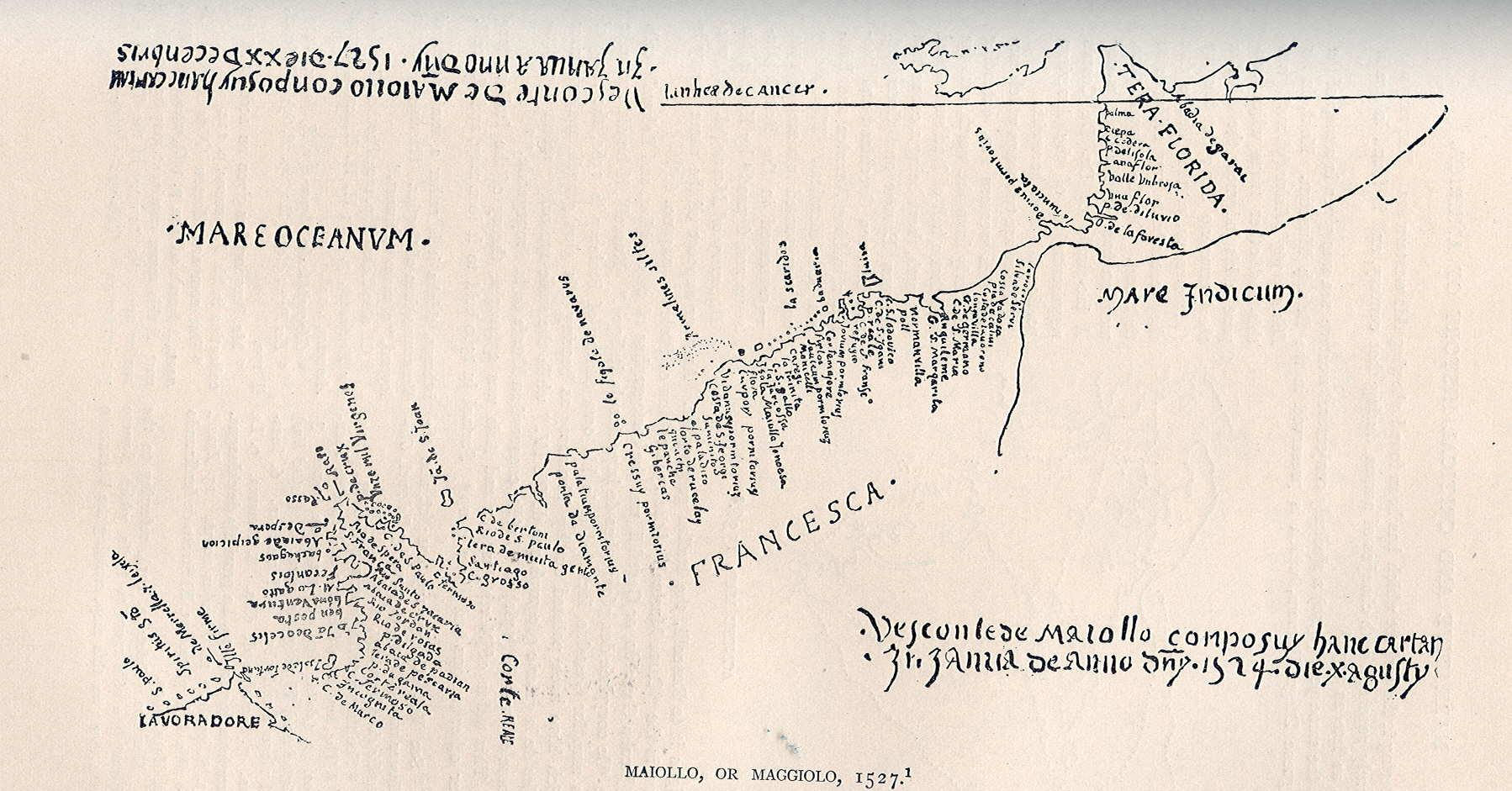
1527 map by Visconte Maggiolo showing the east coast of North America with "Tera Florida" at the top and "Lavoradore" (Labrador) at the bottom. The information supposedly came from Giovanni da Verrazzano's voyage in 1524 (Ambrosian Library in Milan, Italy.)

Visconte Maggiolo (1478 – after 1549), also spelled Maiollo and Maiolo, was a Genoese cartographer.

He was born in Genoa and maybe he was a fellow sailor of explorer Giovanni da Verrazzano. In 1511 he moved to Naples, where he produced three extant nautical atlases. Some historians say that he died of malaria in 1530; but archival documents show that he was still alive, in Genoa, at least in 1549, although he certainly was already dead in 1561.

In 1527, he created a map depicting Verrazzano's travels. This map had a major error (the eponymous "Verrazzano Sea" and "Verrazzano Isthmus", which depicted a large sea, believed to be the Pacific Ocean, across a narrow isthmus on the eastern coast of North America) as Verrazzano did not accurately describe the North American continent. This error continued to show up in maps for over a century. A copy of this 1527 map was destroyed during World War II.

There are numerous portolan charts, atlases and at least two other world maps made by Vesconte Maggiolo: one dated Genoa, 1531; another kept at a public library in Treviso (in Italian), is dated Genoa, 1549.

Although he specialized in the mapping of the Mediterranean Sea, the Black Sea and the Aegean Sea, Maggiolo was the first to report in his atlas of 1548 the toponym of the South American river Rio de Amaxones.

== Gallery ==
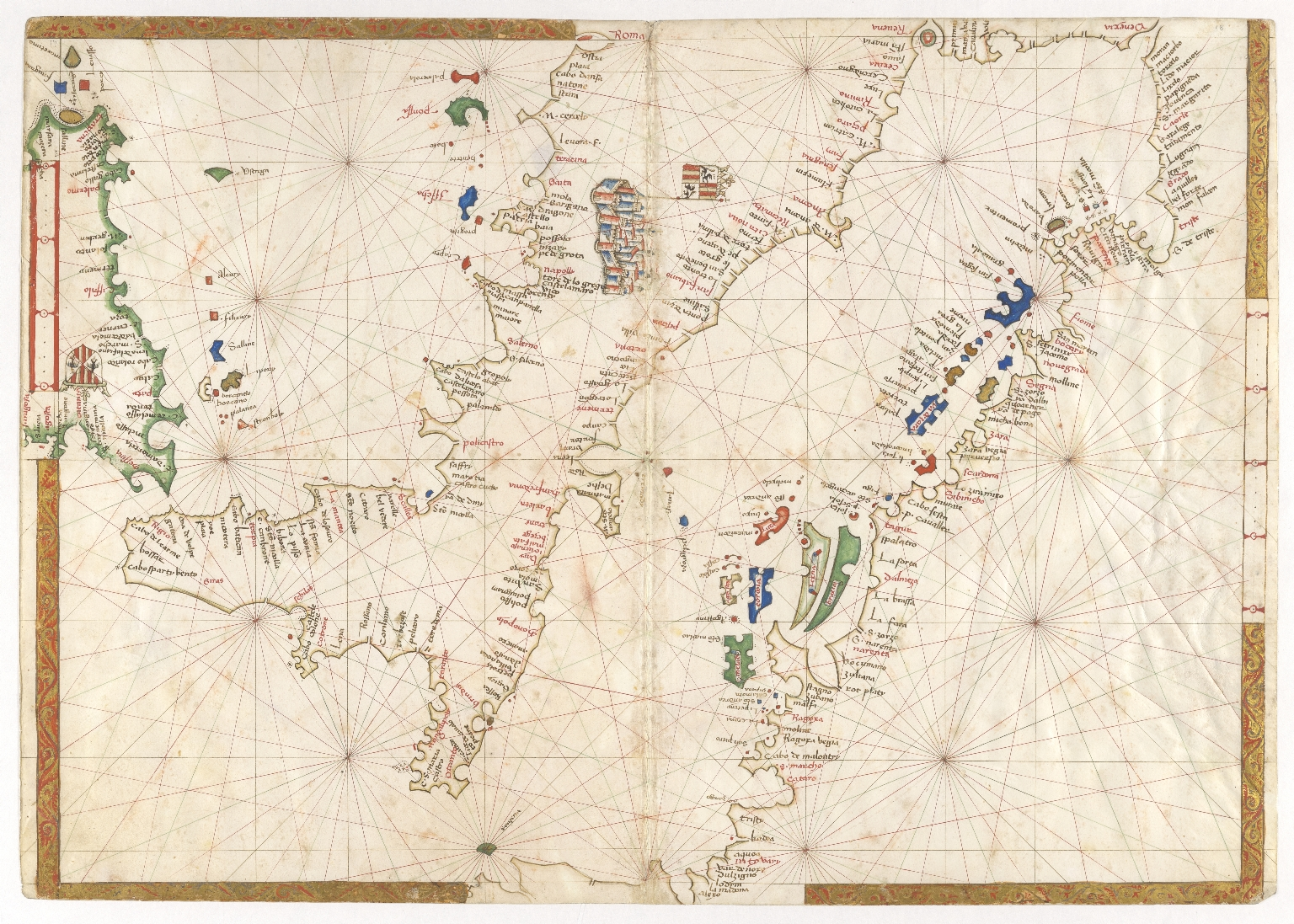
Italy, western Sicily and the Adriatic coast

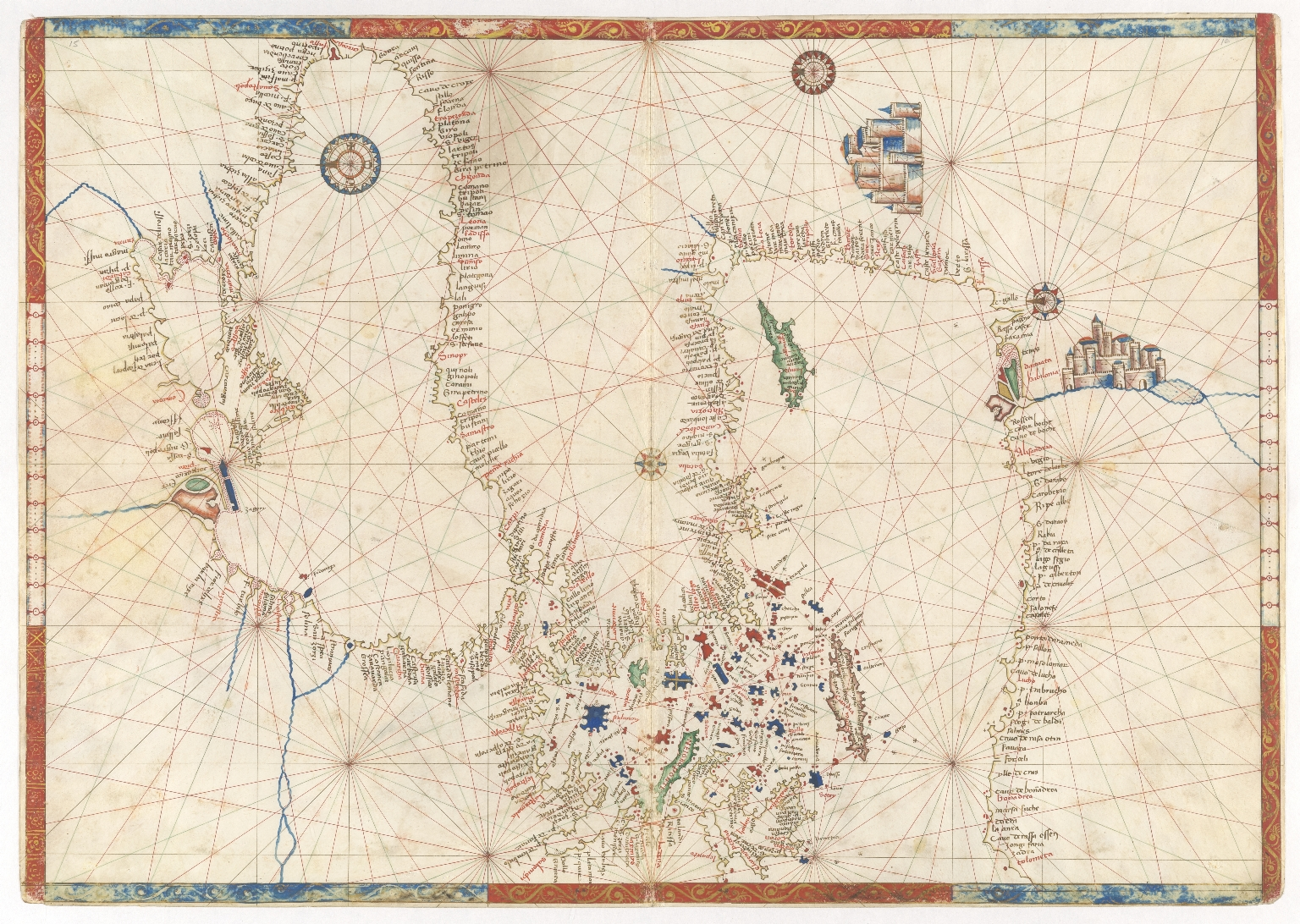
North Africa, Europe and part of Asia

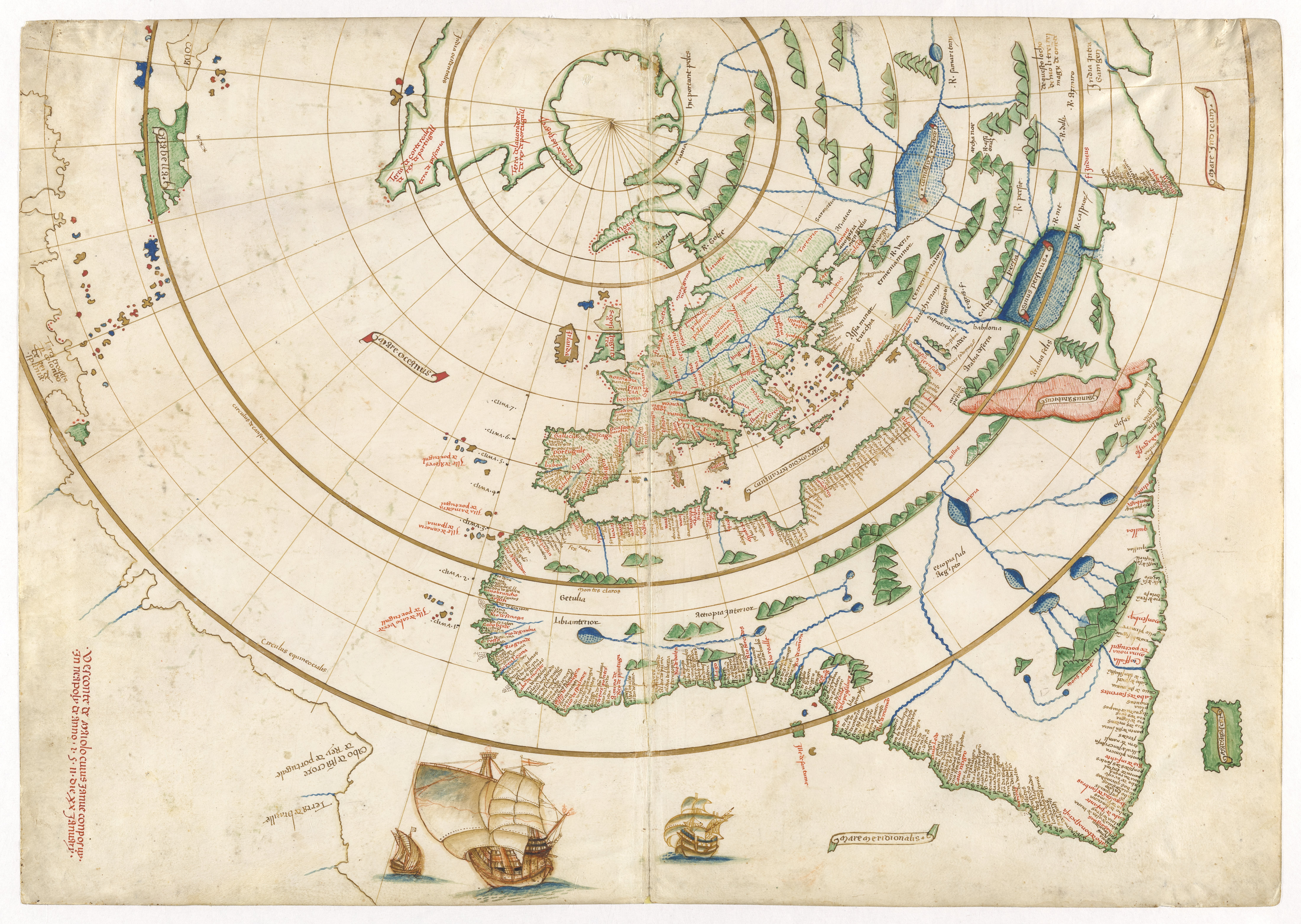
Africa, Asia, Europe and part of the New World

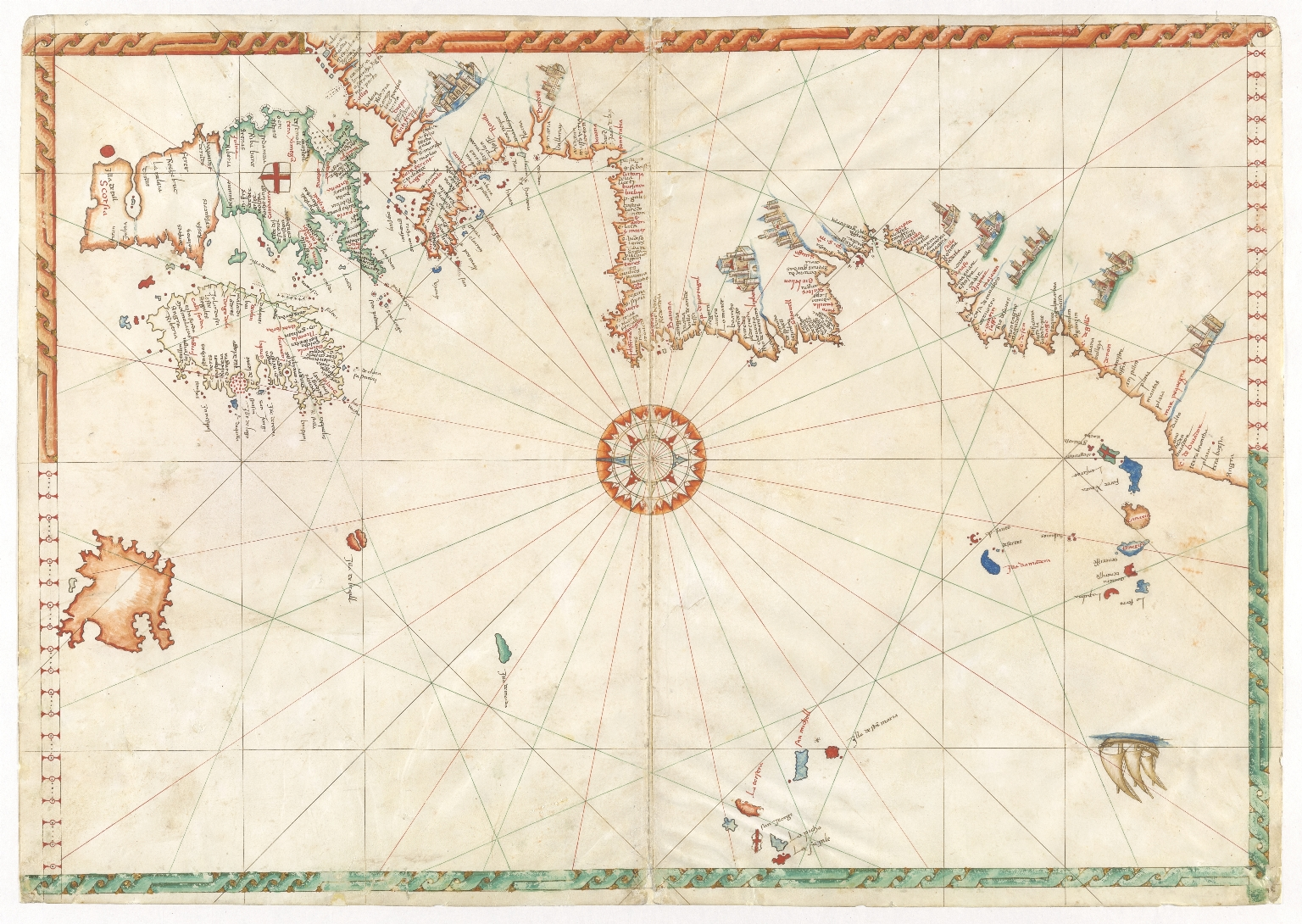
Atlantic coast of Africa and Europe, the British Isles, and Iceland

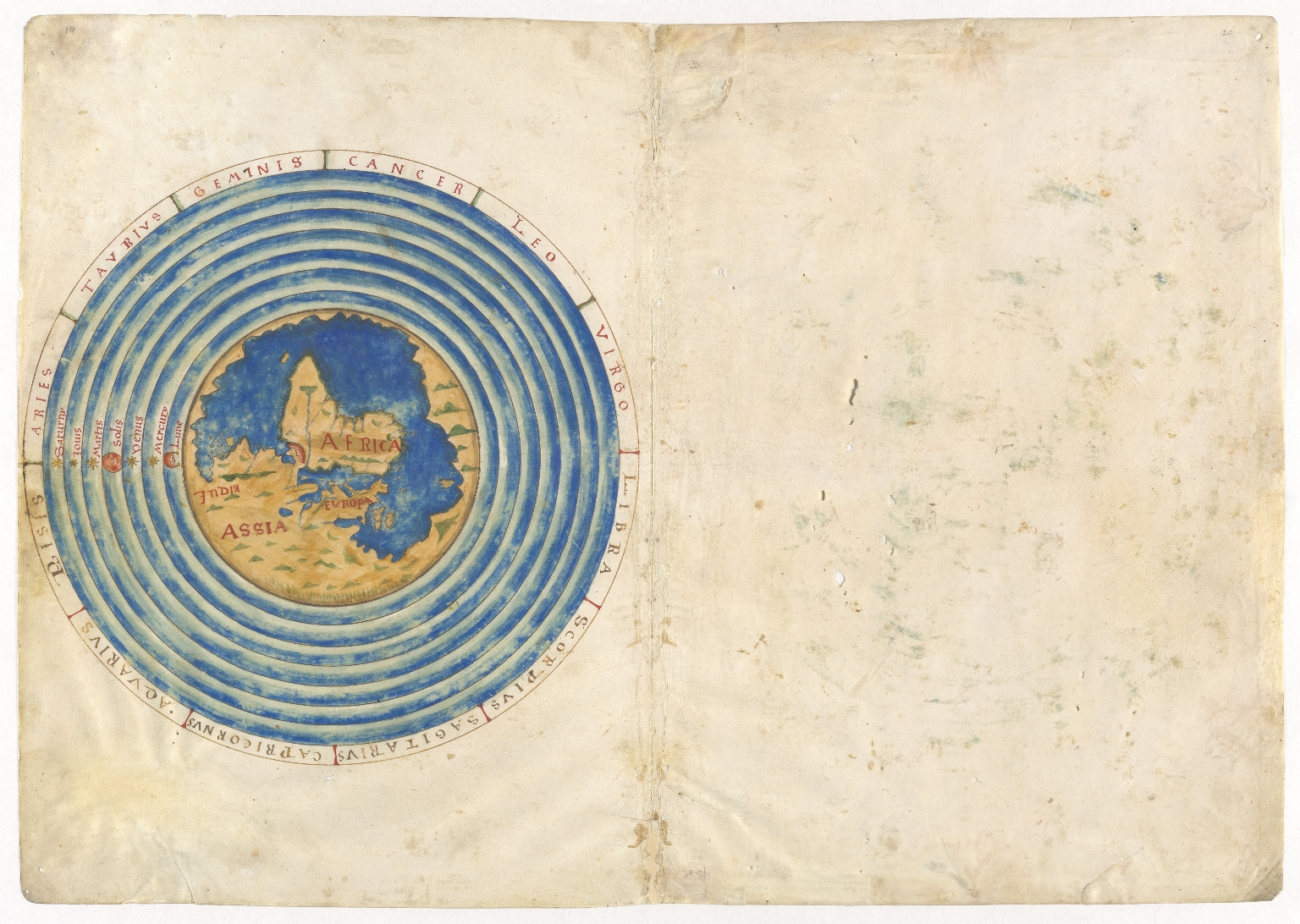
Cosmographical planisphere, with Africa, Asia, and Europe in the center

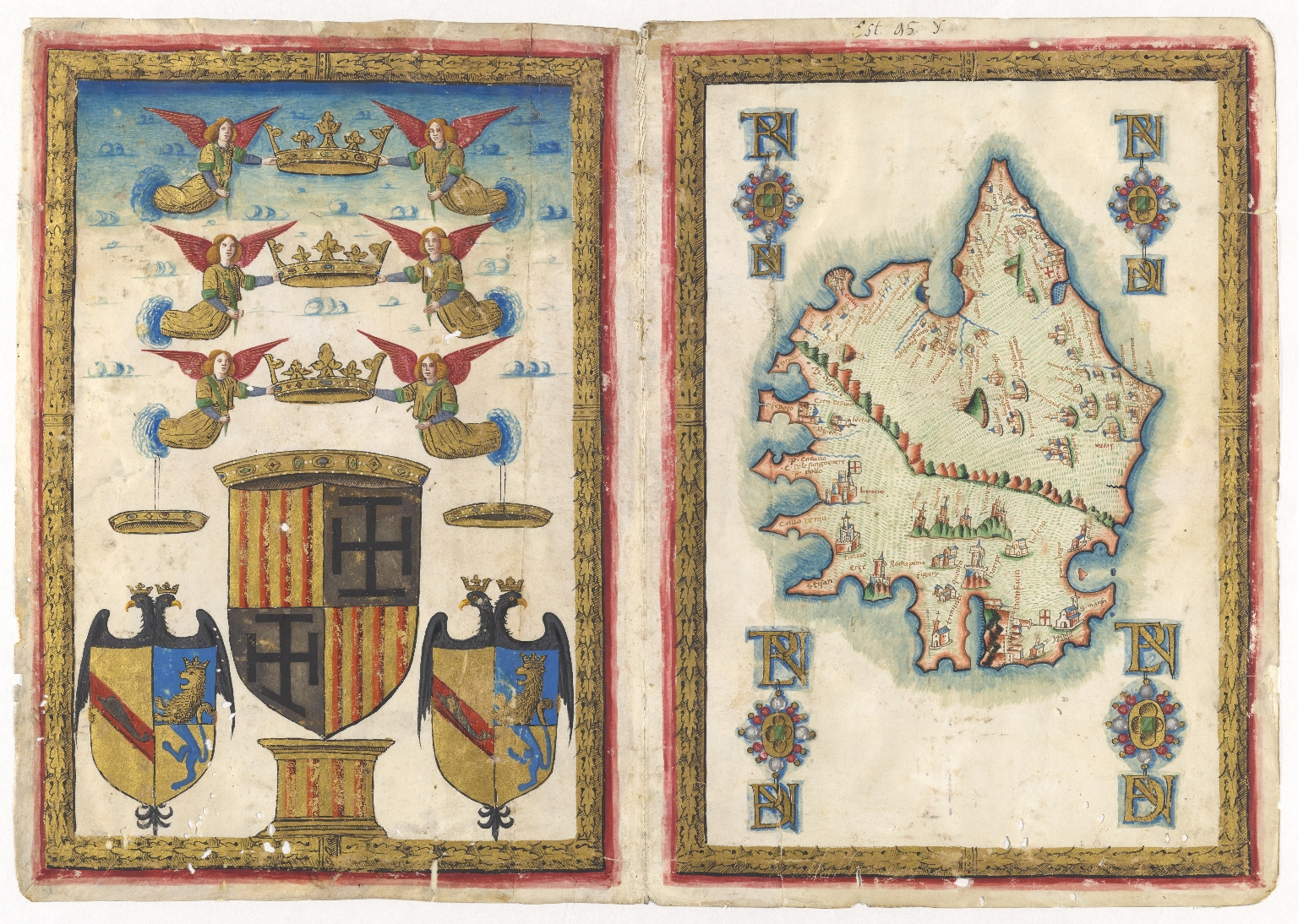
Dedication leaf and map of Corsica

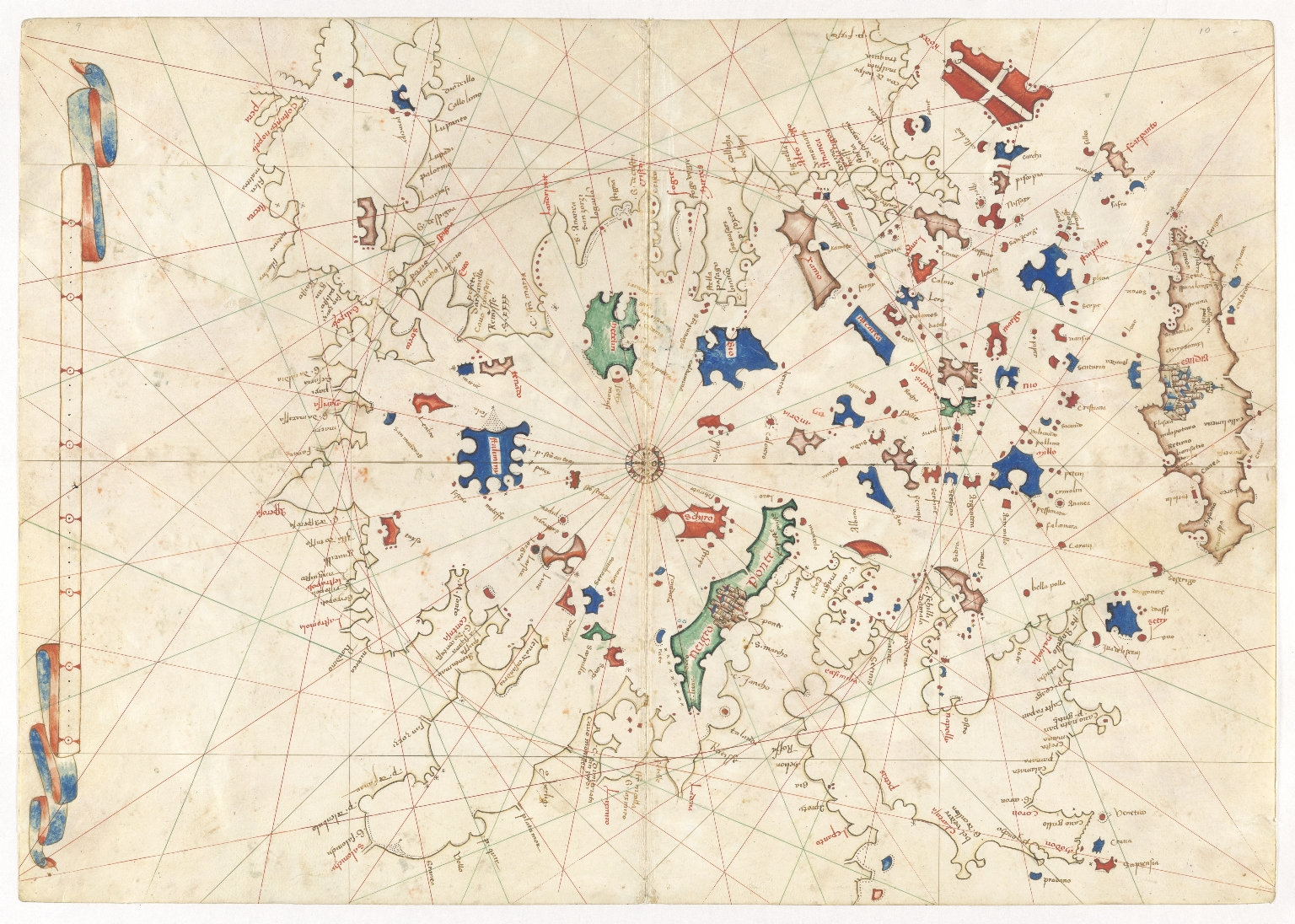
Greek Islands and the Aegean Sea

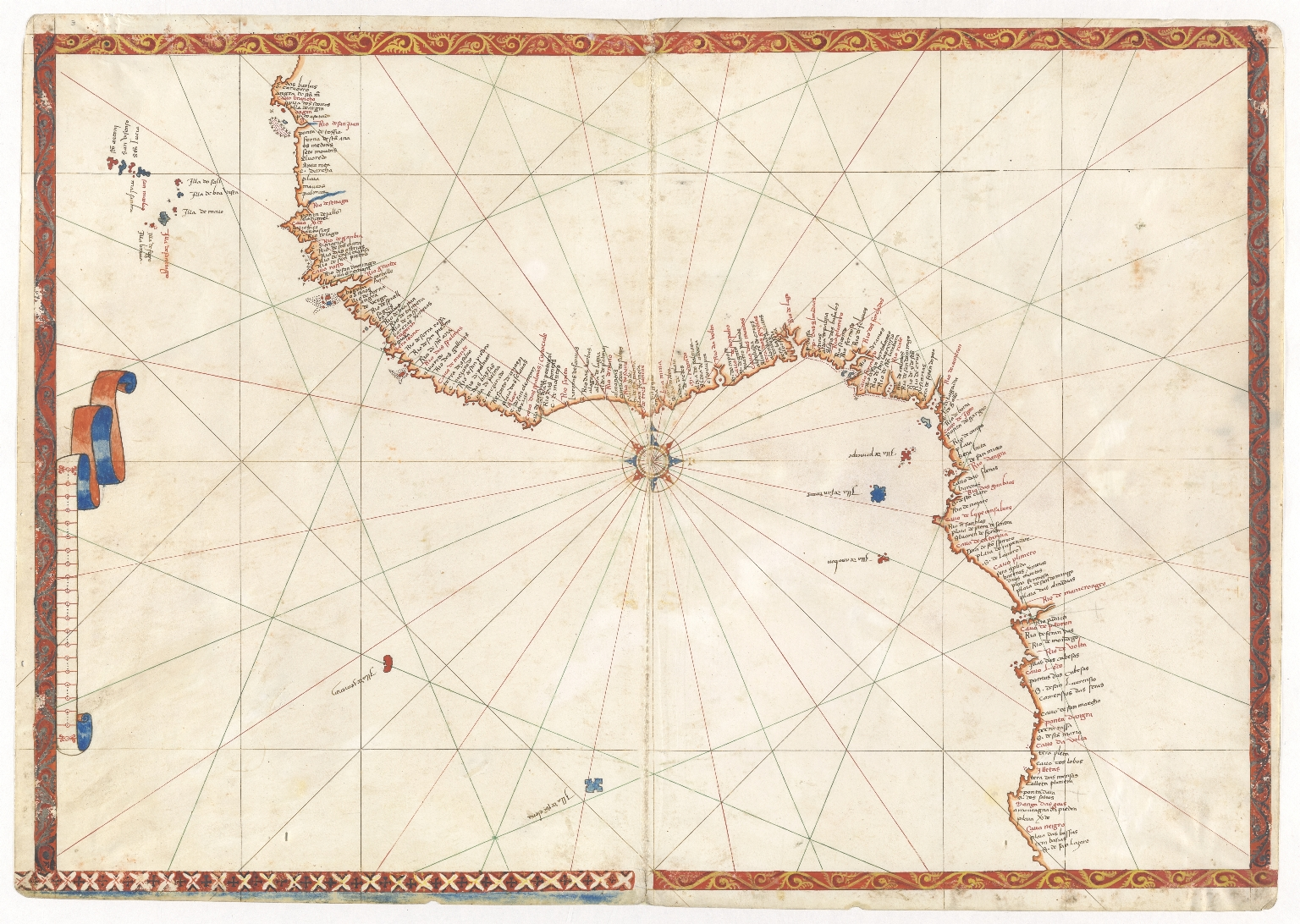
West coast of Africa, including Cape Verde Islands, São Tomé, Príncipe, and Annobón

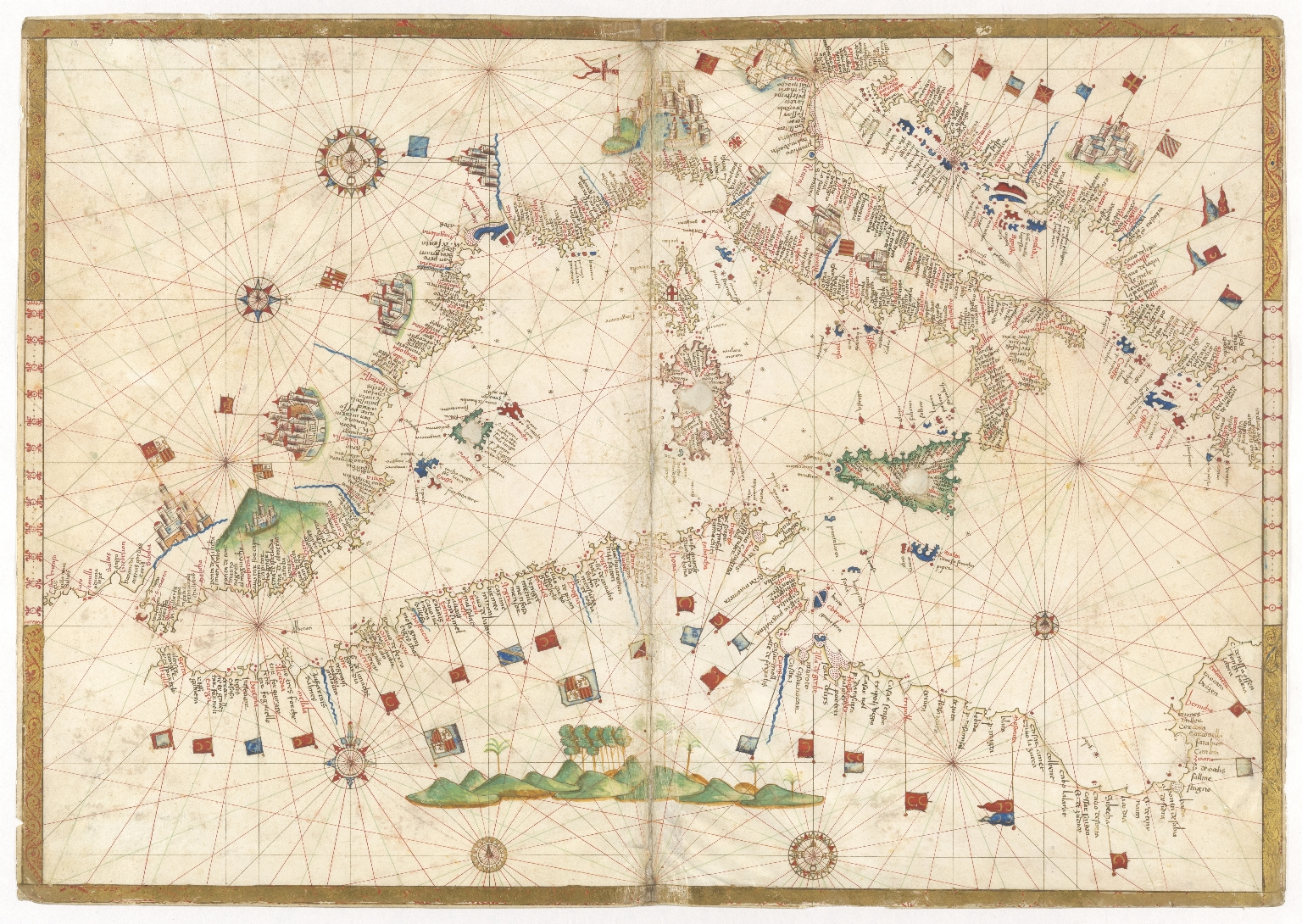
Western Mediterranean

Western hemisphere

== See also ==
- Egerton 2803 maps, portolan atlas attributed to Maggiolo
