= Vicente Yáñez Pinzón =

Spanish navigator, explorer

- Born: c. 1462; Palos de la Frontera, Crown of Castile
- Died: c. 1514 (aged c. 52); Triana, Seville, Crown of Castile
- Occupation: Explorer
- Known for: Captain of the Niña
- Spouse(s): Teresa Rodríguez, Ana Núñez de Trujillo
- Children: Ana Rodríguez, Juana González
- Parent(s): Martín Pinzón, Mayor Vicente
- Relatives: Pinzón brothers

Vicente Yáñez Pinzón (Spanish: [biˈθente ˈʝaɲeθ pinˈθon]) (c. 1462 – after 1514) was a Spanish navigator and explorer, the youngest of the Pinzón brothers. Along with his older brother, Martín Alonso Pinzón (c. 1441 – c. 1493), who captained the Pinta, he sailed with Christopher Columbus on the first voyage to the New World, in 1492, as captain of the Niña.

== Personal life ==
Pinzón was born in Palos de la Frontera on the Atlantic coast of Huelva, youngest of the three prominent sons of seaman Martín Pinzón and his wife Mayor Vicente. His birth year is uncertain; it is generally given as c. 1462; Juan Gil concludes from legal documents that his two daughters were over the age of 20 in 1509, that it certainly cannot be later than 1469. 1469 would be quite a late date, given that there is record of him being a corsair or privateer (with his older brother Martín Alonso) in Mediterranean waters between 1477 and 1479 when other towns failed to provide Palos with an adequate supply of grain in wartime.

He married twice: first to Teresa Rodríguez, by whom he had two daughters, Ana Rodríguez Pinzón and Juana González Pinzón; second, probably in 1509, to Ana de Trujillo, who some surviving documents refer to as "Ana Núñez de Trujillo".

It would appear that he was based in Palos at least up to and including the time of Columbus's first voyage (1492); by 1495 he was living in nearby Moguer; after the economic failure of his 1499–1500 expedition, he appears to have moved no later than 1502 to Seville. He may have moved there to escape creditors. Historian Juan Gil, researching Pinzón's family life, found strong circumstantial evidence that his first wife left behind a mansion in Triana, across the river from Seville: her own property, not his, which passed into the hands of their daughters.

The last primary record of him is in 1514, in Seville or Triana. According to the chronicler Gonzalo Fernández de Oviedo y Valdés, he died that year, probably at the end of September. It is not known precisely where he is buried, though Oviedo expressed confidence that it was in the cemetery of Triana.

== Career ==
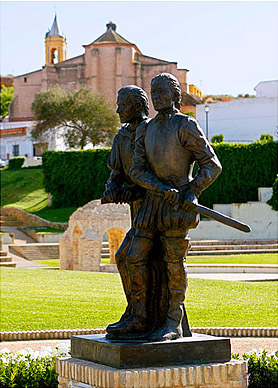
Statue of the Pinzón brothers in Palos de la Frontera.

In 1499, Pinzón sailed to the South American coast. Pinzón eventually disembarked on the shore called "Praia do Paraíso", in present-day Cabo de Santo Agostinho of the state of Pernambuco, or further northwest, in what is today Fortaleza (capital of the Brazilian state of Ceará). According to the Treaty of Tordesillas (1494) between the Crown of Castile and Portugal, Castile (later Spain) could make no claim, but the place was named "Cabo de Santa María de la Consolación" by Pinzón. He also sighted the Amazon River and ascended to a point about fifty miles from the sea. He called it the "Río Santa María de la Mar Dulce" ("River of Saint Mary of the Fresh Water Sea") on account of the vastness of the fresh water river mouth, and he thus became the first European explorer to discover an estuary of the Amazon River. Pinzón is also considered the discoverer of the Oiapoque River.

Unlike other members of the Pinzón family, he always remained loyal to his onetime commander, and in the probings of the pleitos he resisted every official effort to draw out of him anti-Columbus statements.

In 1505, Pinzón was named commander-in-chief and corregidor of the island of Puerto Rico. This was to be the first administrative step in the colonization of the island called "Borinquén" by its Taino inhabitants and "San Juan Bautista" by the Christopher Columbus. However, Pinzón did not fulfill this commission. In 1508, he travelled with Juan Díaz de Solís to South America. No record exists of Pinzón after 1514.

== Legacy ==
In 1832, botanists Mart. & Zucc. published Pinzona, a genus of flowering plants belonging to the family Dilleniaceae and named in honour of Vicente Yáñez Pinzón.

Pinzón Island in The Galapagos is the namesake of him and his brother.

On November 19, 1999, a statue of Pinzón and his brother was dedicated in Palos de la Frontera, Spain, on the occasion of the fifth centennial of the discovery of Brazil and of the brotherhood with the city, Cabo de Santo Agostinho, Brazil.

== See also ==
- List of explorers
- Vicente Yañez Pinzón River, aka Oiapoque

== Bibliography ==
English

- Lemos, William (1992). "Pinzón, Vicente Yáñez". The Christopher Columbus Encyclopedia. New York: Simon & Schuster. pp. 548–549.

Spanish

- Gil, Juan (Sep–Dec 1987), "Sobre la Vida Familiar de Vicente Yáñez Pinzón", Revista de Indias, XLVII (181): 645:754
- Gould, Alice Bache (1984). "Nueva lista documentada de los tripulantes de Colón en 1492".
- Izquierdo Labrado, Julio (1987) Palos de la Frontera en el Antiguo Régimen (1380-1830) Huelva: Instituto de Cooperación Iberoamericana y Ayuntamiento de Palos de la Frontera
- Izquierdo Labrado, Julio (2004) Palermos ilustres Huelva: Ayuntamiento de Palos de la Frontera ISBN 84-606-3612-7
- Manzano y Manzano, Juan; Manzano Fernández-Heredia, Ana María (1988), Los Pinzones y el Descubrimiento de América 3 vol (in Spanish), Madrid: Ediciones de Cultura Hispanica, ISBN 978-84-7232-442-8, OCLC 19216595
- Manzano Manzano, Juan (1988). Los Pinzones y el descubrimiento de América. Madrid: Instituto de Cooperación Iberoamericana. ISBN 84-7232-442-7.
- Ortega, Fray Ángel (1925) La Rábida. Historia documental y crítica 4 vols. Sevilla.
- de Navarette, Martin Fernadez (1829). Viages menores, y los de Vespucio; Poblaciones en el Darien, suplemento al tomo II (in Spanish). pp. 428–.
