= Pinzón–Solís voyage =

Spanish maritime expedition, 1508–1509

Coordinates: 18°N 85°W

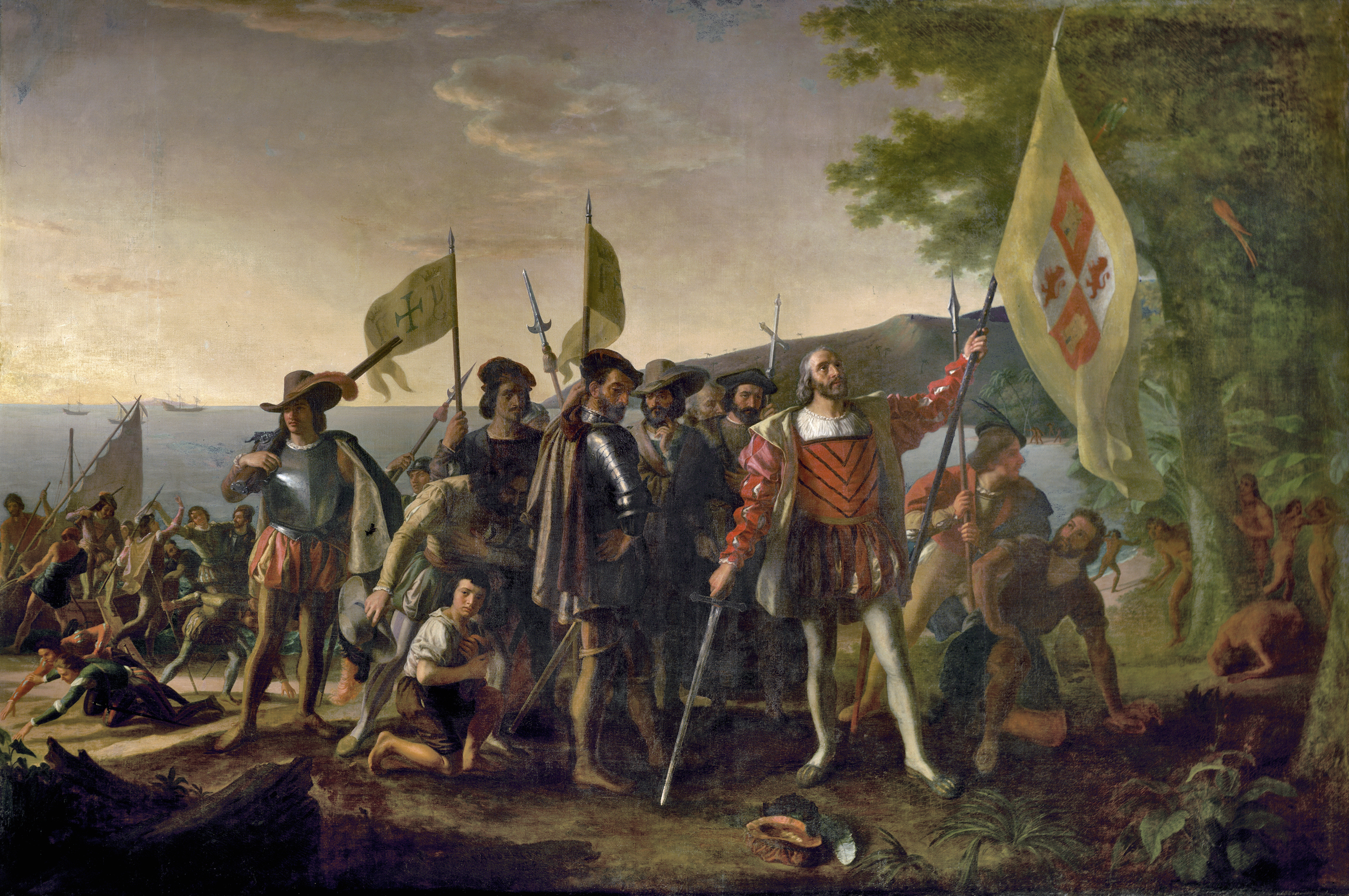
- Landing of Columbus by John Vanderlyn, 1847
- Sponsor: Catholic Monarchs
- Country: Castile or Aragon
- Leader: Vicente Yáñez Pinzón and Juan Díaz de Solís
- Start: Sanlúcar de Barrameda; June 1508
- End: Seville; 29 August 1509
- Goal: To discover a western sea route to La Especiería
- Ships: San Benito (Note: Named Isabelita in. A carabela ('caravel'), Pinzón master.); La Magdalena (Note: Also Magdalena, as in. A nao ('vessel'), Solís master.)
- Crew: c. 60 men (Note: Excluding a number of pressed Indian translators.)
- Achievements: First European survey of western Honduras Bay or eastern Yucatán shores; European discovery of Yucatán (Note: Contested; see route discussion herein.); First European survey of the Gulf of Mexico

The Pinzón–Solís voyage (Note: Also Pinzon for Pinzón, Solis for Solís, expedition for voyage. In definite descriptions, the date is sometimes shortened to voyage of 1508 rather than of 1508–1509, as in, and the explorers' names are sometimes shortened to Pinzón voyage rather than Pinzón–Solís voyage, as in.) was a Spanish maritime expedition of discovery to the Bay of Honduras and the Yucatán Peninsula, and possibly to the Gulf of Mexico, in 1508 and 1509. It was led by Vicente Yáñez Pinzón and Juan Díaz de Solís, following an early 1508 commission from the Catholic Monarchs to explore the mainland coast of north of Veragua, in the Mosquito Gulf of Middle America, where Christopher Columbus suspected they might find a sea lane going west to La Especiería in the Far East. The explorers failed to find such a route, but their trip is nonetheless noted as the earliest non-Amerindian survey of the shoreline west and north of the Bay Islands, in what is now Honduras, Guatemala, Belize, and possibly Quintana Roo, Mexico. In doing so, Pinzón and Solís built upon the cartographic findings of Columbus's fourth voyage.

Few primary sources on the Pinzón–Solís voyage survive, leading to much scholarly debate regarding its details, including to the present day. Exactly how far up the coast of Yucatán the Spanish captains sailed, and whether they rounded Cape Catoche to enter the Gulf of Mexico and survey some part of its eastern or southern seaboard, is still debated in historical literature.

== Background ==
Upon coasting the mainland in Honduras Bay (top left) and Mosquito Gulf (bottom left), Columbus figured a route to the Far East might lie northwest or southeast of the area, leading the Catholic Monarchs to commission expeditions in both directions in 1508

The San Benito and Magdalena may have been small caravels like the Pinta (modern replica shown)

Since the first voyage by Christopher Columbus in 1492 and 1493, the Catholic Monarchs of Spain had expected but not yet received word of a western sea lane to La Especiería, in modern Indonesia. As the years wore on, the lack of progress in said discovery became so obvious and intolerable to the Spanish sovereigns that on 13 March 1505 (at first), and then on 23 August 1506 (again), renowned seafarers Vicente Yáñez Pinzón and Amerigo Vespucci were each commissioned to explore the New World and locate the needed maritime passage to the Far East.

For some reason or another, however, neither explorer got to undertake the called for expeditions, leaving both commissions to lapse. Consequently, in March 1508, Ferdinand II of Aragon convened "the most distinguished navigators" of the day to Burgos, in Castile, to advise him on the best course of action so as to discover the said sea lane. The convention, a junta known as the Junta de Burgos of 1508, was attended by the king himself, in addition to bishop Juan Rodríguez de Fonseca and explorers Juan de la Cosa and Amerigo Vespucci, and reached a number of consequential decisions, like that of establishing the office of piloto mayor ('pilot major') in the Casa de Contratación. As a result of this junta, on 23 March, Pinzón and Juan Díaz de Solís were jointly commissioned by capitulación (Note: 'Letters patent by the Spanish crown authorising expeditions for exploration or conquest'.) to explore the explore the mainland coast north of Veragua, which is to say north of Cape Gracias a Dios, with the former given command over military matters, and the latter over maritime ones. The junta came to this decision because Columbus, after his fourth and last voyage in 1502 to 1504, had surmised that passage to Cathay and Zipango (Note: See Zipango.) might lie somewhere near Veragua.

Pinzón and Solís resolved to follow through on their instructions, and so headed to Seville on 25 March, to make all the necessary preparations. They outfitted and victualled the caravel San Benito (Pinzón master) and ship La Magdalena (Solís master), and enlisted men to crew them, including "renowned pilot" Pedro de Ledesma, and veedor (Note: 'Person authorised to conduct administrative or judicial inquiries'.) and scribe Alonso Páez. The outlay on these arrangements, including rent, wages and provisions, is thought to have ran over 1.7 million maravedis, and possibly close to two million.

== Voyage ==
Possible Pinzón–Solís routes (Note: Map shows only points or stops along the main leg of itineraries proposed in literature; see list below for locations on the opening and closing legs of possible Pinzón–Solís routes.)
1 Gracias a Dios
2 Guanaxa
3 Point A between 2 and 4 (unidentified)
4 Amatique (possible)
5 Point B between 4 and 6 (unidentified, possible)
6 Catoche (possible)
7 Tampico (possible)
8 Santo Domingo

Very few first-hand accounts of Pinzón and Solís's itinerary in the Middle American mainland survive, whereas the journey they lay out is contradicted in some contemporary second-hand accounts, such that historians have had to adjudicate the matter since then. As such, a number of conflicting routes have been proposed in scholarly literature, with varying degrees of confidence and to greater or lesser acceptance in the field.

The San Benito and Magdalena are known to have embarked to open sea from Sanlúcar de Barrameda. The date of their departure is uncertain, but Pinzón and Solís are thought to have finalised all preparations by May 1508 at the latest. Consequently, most historians deem it likely that the expedition took off at some point in June of that year.

As regards the Spanish explorers' course upon sighting the northern limit of Veragua, there have been two discrepant theories proposed in literature: that Pinzón and Solís followed the Honduran leg of the fourth Columbian voyage and then coasted further west and north of the same, or that they did only the former and not the latter. The first route, going west from Gracias a Dios to Guanaxa and then farther on, is the one reported in first-hand accounts by Pinzón and Ledesma. According to the latter, the expeditionaries "discovered, above the land of Veragua to the north, all which up to now [in 1513] has come to be known from the island of Guanaxa northwards, which lands are called Chavañin y Pintigua which they reached going north up to 23 degrees and 30 minutes". Pinzón gave a similar account, maintaining that he and Solís explored the mainland "from the island of Guanaxa to the province of Camarona; going along the coast towards the east there is another province called Chabañin e Pintigue, which was discovered by this witness and Juan Solís, and that they similarly discovered going along the coast, a great bay which they named Gran baya de la Navidad, and from there this witness discovered the syerras de Carya and other lands too farther ahead, and that these provinces never the said don Cristóbal colón nor any other ever reached". The latter route, going west from Gracias a Dios to Guanaxa and no farther, is the one reported in some second-hand accounts, most notably that of Ferdinand Columbus in his 1571 Historie del S. D. Fernando Colombo, (Note: Written by the 1530s.) wherein the Pinzón–Solís voyage is described as merely a replication of the last Columbian expedition. Ferdinand, who along with Ledesma had accompanied Christopher Columbus in 1502 to 1504, naturally would have had close access to the said pilot, and purportedly even got to examine some charts which Ledesma had drafted, depicted their 1508 and 1509 journey and discoveries.

That said, modern historical consensus has overwhelmingly favoured the first itinerary, in which Pinzón and Solís go farther west and north of Columbus, up to, at least, some point on the eastern coast of the Yucatán Peninsula. In which case, the said explorers would have reconnoitred, at a minimum, all the southern and some portion of the western shores of the Bay of Honduras, which is to say, the entire Caribbean coast of modern Honduras and Guatemala, plus (at least) some of the coast of modern Belize, and (possibly) some of the eastern coast of modern Quintana Roo, Mexico.

Scholarly opinion, however, is still seemingly divided as to how much farther they got. Some historians deem it likely that the Spanish mariners reached and perhaps even rounded Cape Catoche, whereas others consider it more likely that they did not sail so far north. The following are the itineraries most noted in historical literature. For these, the opening leg refers to the route taken by Pinzón and Solís from Santo Domingo to Gracias a Dios, whilst the closing leg refers to their route back to said Hispaniolan port.

- From the opening leg to Guanaxa, then to some point A between this island and Amatique, then from said point A to the closing leg.
- As above, except going from point A to Amatique, then to some point B between this bay and Catoche, then from said point B to the closing leg.
- As above, except going from point B to Catoche, then to the closing leg.
- As above, except going from Catoche to Tampico, then to the closing leg.

Whatever the case though, by May 1509, Pinzón and Solís were certainly in Santo Domingo, intending to revictual before crossing back home. Here, in an extraordinary move, governor Nicolás de Ovando had the San Benito and Magdalena boarded and searched, but they were eventually cleared by port authorities and got underway. They arrived in Seville on 29 August 1509, with "diverse objects of guanines" (Note: 'Indian jewellery made of guanín'. These were apparently destined for a foundry to be melted into ingots.) and "various" Indians whom the Spanish crew had pressed (or abducted).

== Aftermath ==
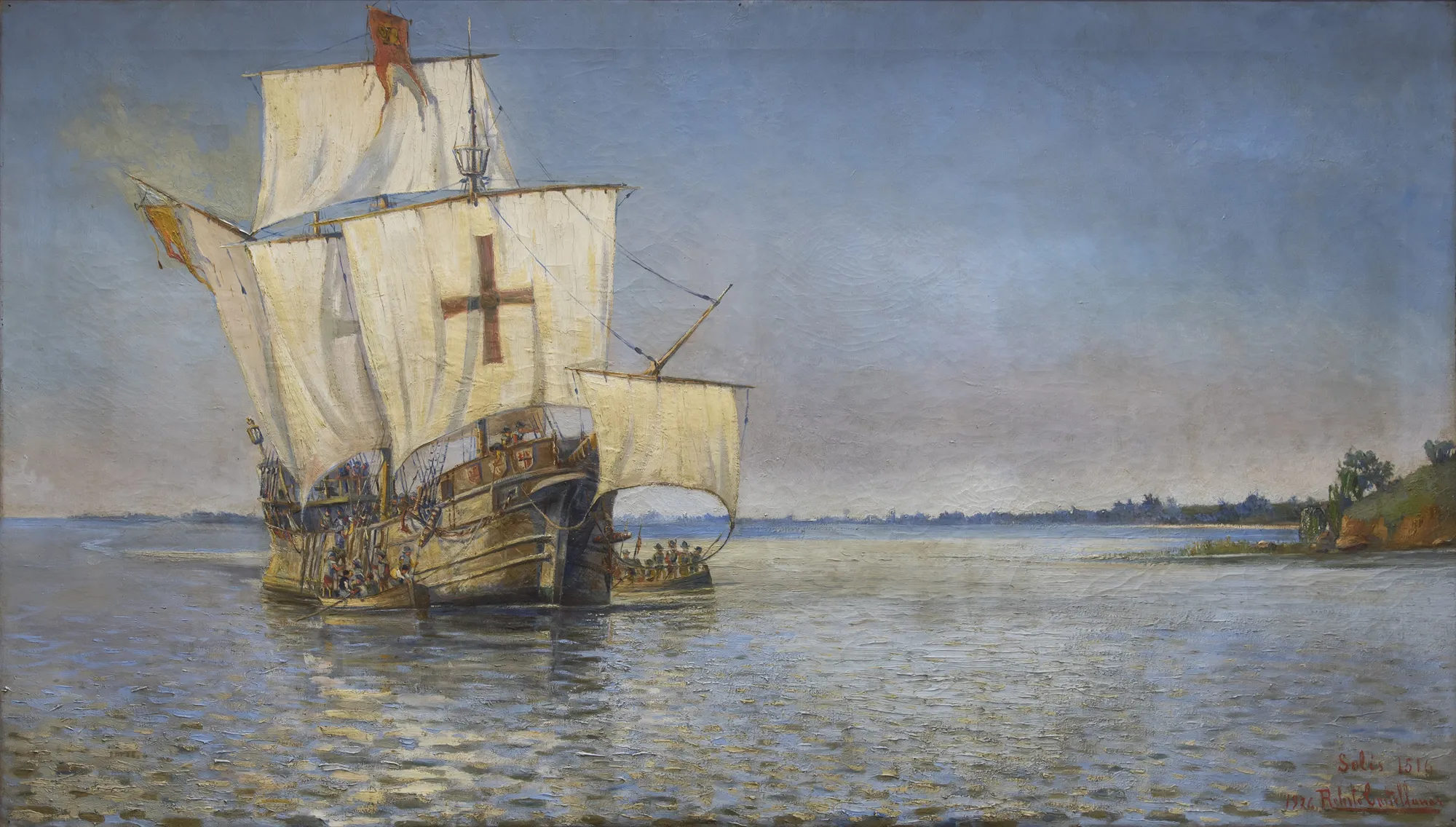
Pinzón and Solís were rewarded with posts in the Casa de Contratación upon their return (Solís in Río de la Plata in 1516 shown)

Pinzón and Solís brought back Indian jewellery of silver and gold, and may have used it to smooth over legal trouble (Maya example shown)

The Pinzón–Solís voyage failed to discover a western sea lane to La Especiería, but their geographic discoveries helped to (correctly) steer later Spanish exploratory expeditions away from Middle America, thus countering the wrong (but influential) conjecture by Columbus that located such a route in the vicinity of Veragua.

Upon disembarking in Seville in late August 1509, Pinzón formally accused Solís of having breached their capitulación, whereupon the latter was detained by authorities, pending an investigation. Apparently, further allegations of such offences surfaced in short order, this time against both captains, such that Pinzón too was soon detained. Proceedings were eventually resolved in Pinzón and Solís's favour, though this purportedly happened only after Ledesma had remitted some guanines to the Spanish court in Valladolid. Later on, Pinzón received a laudatory real orden ('royal order') from Ferdinand II (on 8 April 1510), whilst Solís succeeded Vespucci as the second piloto mayor of the Casa de Contratación (in March 1512). Solís was further awarded 34,000 maravedis (in compensation), and both Pinzón and Ledesma were later likewise appointed to lucrative offices in the Casa de Contratación.

== Legacy ==
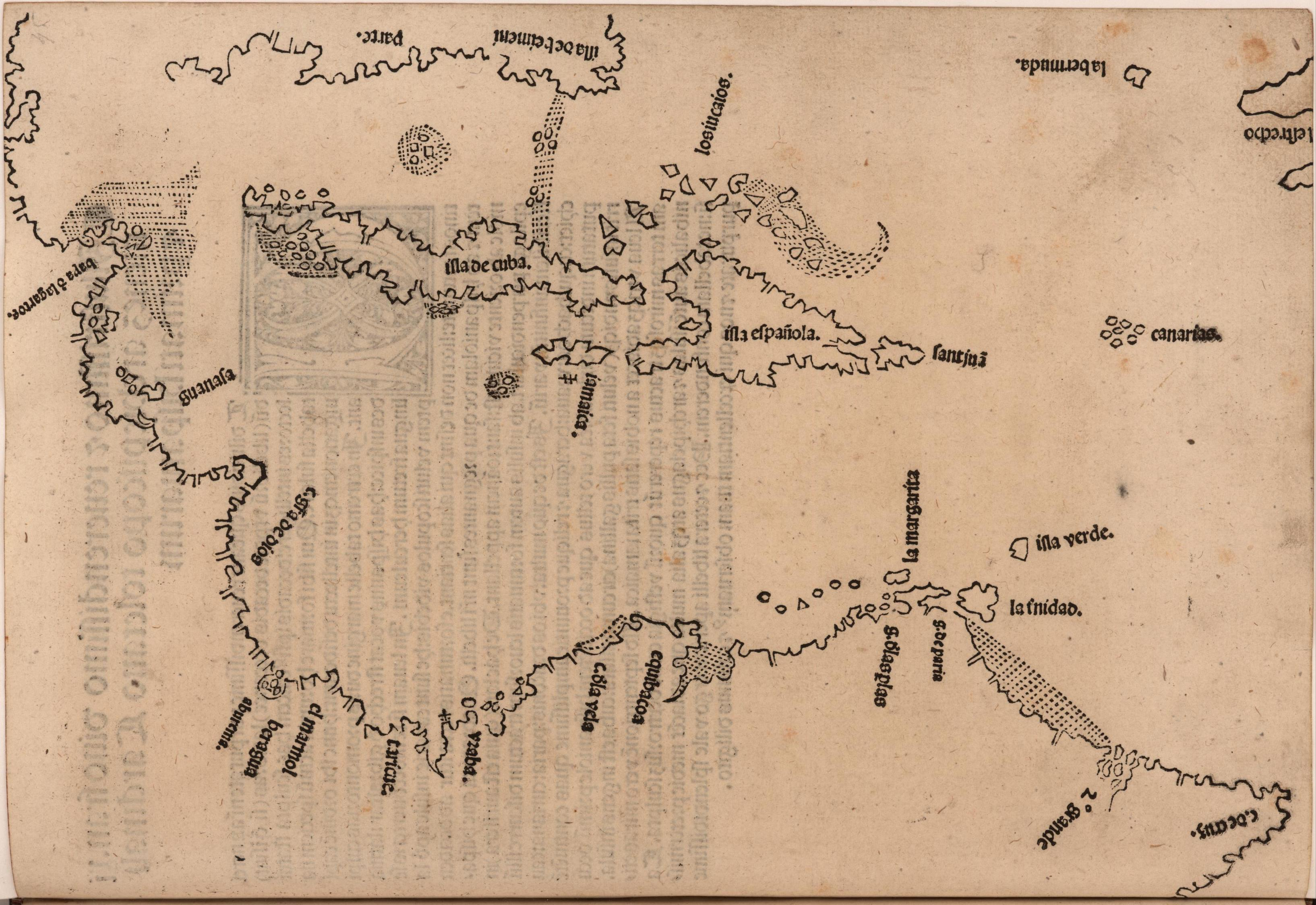
Middle American mainland discoveries by Pinzón and Solís in 1508 and 1509 were first put to print in the Peter Martyr map, drafted 1514

The first print map to feature the geographic findings of the Pinzón–Solís voyage is thought to have been the Peter Martyr map, drafted on 4 December 1514 by bishop Rodríguez de Fonseca and Peter Martyr d'Anghiera, for publication in reprints of the latter's 1511 crónica de Indias, Legatio Babylonica. Additionally, though the European discovery of Yucatán commonly credited to the Hernández de Córdoba expedition of 1517, some historians have countered that the feat should properly be attributed to Pinzón and Solís in 1508 and 1509.

The said explorers are further credited by some (but not all) historians with the (non-Amerindian) discovery of some 300 leagues of coastline north and northwest of the Bay Islands, from 16° 28' N in the Bay of Honduras, up and around the Yucatán Peninsula and into the Gulf of Mexico, then coasting along said gulf from east to west, up to 23° 30' N.

== See also ==
- Magellan expedition – discovered a western sea lane to La Especiería by 1522
- Spain in the Age of Discovery
- Spanish exploration of the Pacific
- Iberian cartography, 1400–1600
- European exploration of North America

== Notes and references ==
=== References ===
1. de Altolaguirre y Duvale A, Bonilla y San Martín A, eds. (1892). De los pleitos de Colón. Colección de documentos inéditos relativos al descubrimiento, conquista y organización de las antiguas posesiones españolas de ultramar : Segunda serie : Colección de documentos inéditos de ultramar. Vol. 7. Madrid: Real Academia de la Historia.
2. Ezquerra Abadía R (1970). "El viaje de Pinzón y Solís al Yucatán". Revista de Indias. 30 (119–122): 217–238.
3. Fernández de Navarrete M (1829). Viajes menores. Colección de los viajes y descubrimientos que hicieron por mar los españoles desde fines del siglo XV. Vol. 3. Madrid: Imprenta real. hdl:2027/mdp.39015051104092.
4. García Cruzado E, ed. (2011). Jornadas IV, V y VI, 2008, 2009 y 2010. Actas de las jornadas de historia sobre el descubrimiento de América. Vol. II. Palos de la Frontera, Spain: Universidad Internacional de Andalucía; Ayuntamiento de Palos de la Frontera. hdl:10334/3367. ISBN 978-84-7993-211-4.
5. García Cruzado E, ed. (2015). Jornadas VII, VIII, IX y X, 2011, 2012, 2013 y 2014. Actas de las jornadas de historia sobre el descubrimiento de América. Vol. III. Palos de la Frontera, Spain: Universidad Internacional de Andalucía; Ayuntamiento de Palos de la Frontera. hdl:10334/3633. ISBN 978-84-7993-263-3.
6. Gómez Martín JA (June 2013). "El descubrimiento del Yucatán". Revista de estudios colombinos. 9: 53–60. ISSN 1699-3926.
7. Markham CR, ed. (2010) [first published 1894 by the Hakluyt Society]. The Letters of Amerigo Vespucci and Other Documents Illustrative of his Career. Works Issued by the Hakluyt Society. Vol. XC (reprint of 1st ed.). Farnham, England: Ashgate. ISBN 978-1-4094-1596-1.
8. Pacheco JF, de Cárdenas F, Torres de Mendoza L, eds. (1884). Colección de documentos inéditos relativos al descubrimiento, conquista y organización de las antiguas posesiones españolas en América y Oceanía, sacados de los Archivos del Reino, y muy especialmente del de Indias. Colección de documentos inéditos de Indias. Vol. 36. Madrid: Imprenta de Manuel G Hernández.
9. Peck DT (May 2003). "The First European Charting of Florida and the Adjacent Shores". Florida Geographer. 34: 82–114. ISSN 0739-0041.
10. Polo Martín B (June 2015). "La controversia sobre la cartografía del cuarto viaje colombino durante la regencia de Fernando el Católico: la ruta real". Revista de estudios colombino. 11: 143–156. ISSN 1699-3926.
11. Reichert R (January–June 2017). "El golfo de Honduras: estrategias geopolíticas y militares de una frontera imperial, siglos XVI-XVIII". Tzintzun. 65: 9–40. ISSN 2007-963X.
12. Tilton DW (1993). "Latitudes, Errors and the Northern Limit of the 1508 Pinzón and Solís Voyage". Terrae Incognitae. 25: 25–40. doi:10.1179/tin.1993.25.1.25.
13. Varela Marcos J (Autumn 2005). "Las costas mexicanas en el primer mapa impreso de América". Revista de humanidades: Tecnológico de Monterrey. 19: 145–168. ISSN 1405-4167.
14. Varela Marcos J (3 May 2018a). "Juan Díaz de Solís". Diccionario biográfico electrónico. Madrid: Real Academia de la Historia.
15. Varela Marcos J (3 May 2018b). "Vicente Yáñez Pinzón". Diccionario biográfico electrónico. Madrid: Real Academia de la Historia.
16. Zalama MA, ed. (2010). Juana I en Tordesillas: su mundo, su entorno. Valladolid, Spain: Ayuntamiento de Tordesillas; Ministerio de Cultura. ISBN 978-84-932810-9-0.
