= Giovanni Vespucci =

Italian-Spanish geographer, cartographer and cosmographer

Giovanni Vespucci (1487 – after 1527), also known as Juan Vespucio or Vespucci, was an Italo-Spanish geographer, cartographer, and cosmographer.

He was born in Florence in 1487. He moved to Seville in Castile, Spain, where his uncle Amerigo Vespucci was pilot major of the House of Indies. Following Amerigo's death, Giovanni (now called Juan) was employed as a cartographer and cosmographer. He was also made a citizen of Castile.

In 1524, he was called upon as an expert to attend a board meeting between representatives of Spain and Portugal in Badajoz to clarify the status of their territorial arrangements, together with the likes of Hernando Colón, Sebastián Caboto, Juan Sebastián Elcano, Diego Ribeiro, and Esteban Gómez.

== Maps ==
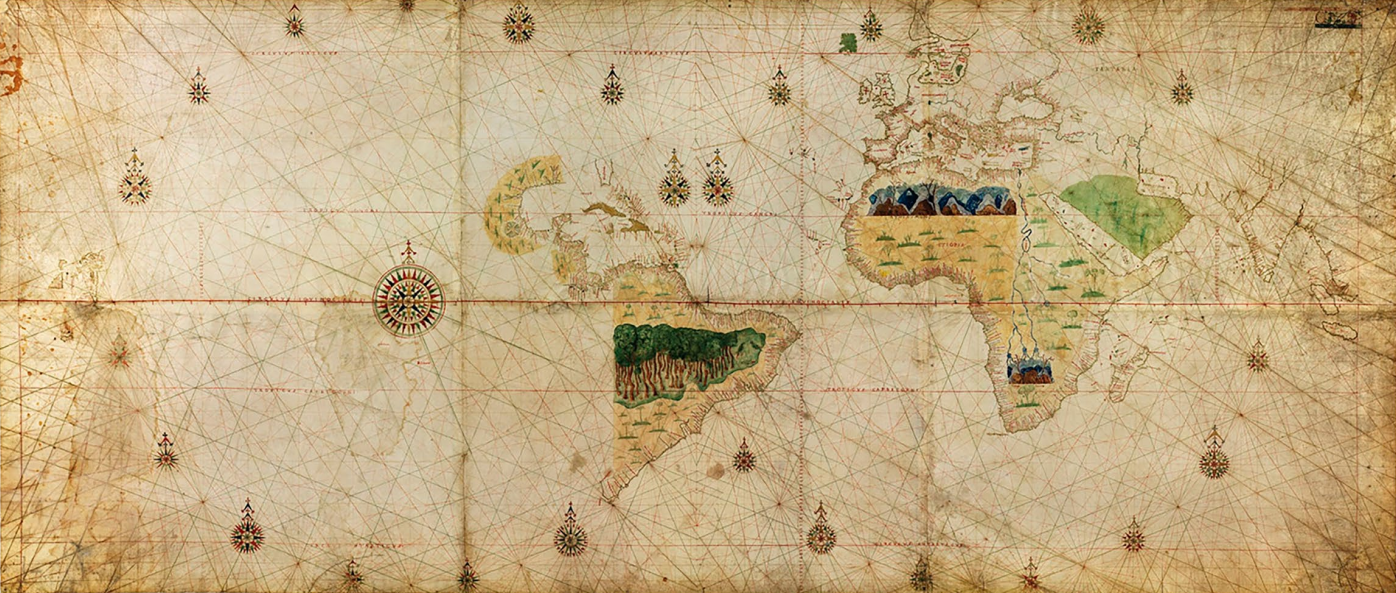
The Geocarta Nautica Universale (1523), the first known map to show the discoveries of the Magellan Expedition, believed to have been a copy of the Spanish Padron Real drafted under Vespucci and now held by the Royal Library of Turin.

Two manuscript maps signed by Juan Vespucci have been preserved. One is a portolan chart dated 1520, the other a large nautical-style planisphere dated 1526. Both were made in Seville.

In addition, a world map in polar azimuthal equidistant projection was published around 1524 with a title that attributes it to Juan Vespucci. Three different versions are known.
