= Juan Díaz de Solís =

European navigator and explorer (c. 1470–1516)

Juan Díaz de Solís (c. 1470 – 20 January 1516) was a 16th-century navigator and explorer. He is also said to be the first European to land in what is now Uruguay.

== Biography ==
His origins are disputed. One document records him as a Portuguese in the service of Castile ("Spain"), having possibly been born in Lisbon or São Pedro de Solis. Others claim that his birth took place in Lebrija, in what is now the province of Seville, Spain, where documentation testifies that he lived when he was in Castile, as vecino ("neighbor"), meaning living there. However he began his naval career in Portugal as João Dias de Solis, where he became a pilot in the Portuguese India Armadas. After leaving his home in Lisbon he embarked on a ship to India that he was going to navigate as pilot, a ship captained by Afonso de Albuquerque, in the 1506 armada of Tristão da Cunha. The day the fleet weighed anchor was the very day he was accused of the death of his wife. He also served as a privateer in French fleets for a short time before serving, later, the Spanish Crown.

He served as navigator on expeditions to the Yucatán in 1506-1507 and Brazil in 1508 with Vicente Yáñez Pinzón. He became Pilot Major of Spain in 1512 following the death of Amerigo Vespucci, and was thereafter commissioned to update the Padrón Real with Juan Vespucio.

Two years after appointment to this office, Díaz de Solís prepared an expedition to explore the southern part of the new American continent. His three ships and crew of 70 men sailed from Sanlúcar de Barrameda, in Spain, on 8 October 1515. He followed the eastern coast of South America southward as far as the mouth of the Río de la Plata. He reached and named the Río de la Plata in 1516, sailing upriver to the confluence of the Uruguay River and the Paraná River with two officers and seven men. Surviving crew members reported Díaz de Solís and most of the other men had been killed, thus putting the expedition to an end. His brother-in-law, Francisco de Torres, took charge of the ships and returned to Spain.

== Honors ==
Several places in Uruguay are named after Juan Díaz de Solís:

- bodies of water:
  - Arroyo Solís Chico
- populated places:
  - Balneario Solís
  - Solís de Mataojo
- other:
  - Solís Theatre, the most important theatre in Montevideo
  - Route 10 Juan Díaz de Solís
