= Diogo Ribeiro =

16th-century Portuguese cartographer

Facsimile of Ribeiro's original 1527 world map, now held by the Anna Amalia Bibliothek in Weimar, Germany.

William Griggs's facsimile of Ribeiro's 1529 original world map, now held by the Vatican Library.

Diogo Ribeiro (d. 16 August 1533) was a Portuguese cartographer and explorer who worked most of his life in Spain, where he was known as Diego Ribero. He worked on the official maps of the Padrón Real (or Padrón General) from 1518 to 1532. He also made navigation instruments, including astrolabes and quadrants.

== Early life ==
Born as Diogo Ribeiro, he was the son of Afonso Ribeiro and Beatriz d’Oliveira. However, there is no known record of the date and place of his birth. He is believed to have become a seaman at an early age and made several voyages to India as a ship pilot. Reportedly, Ribeiro sailed with Pedro Afonso de Aguiar who served as captain in the armadas of the explorers Vasco da Gama (1502), Lopo Soares (1504), and Afonso de Albuquerque (1509).

== Career ==
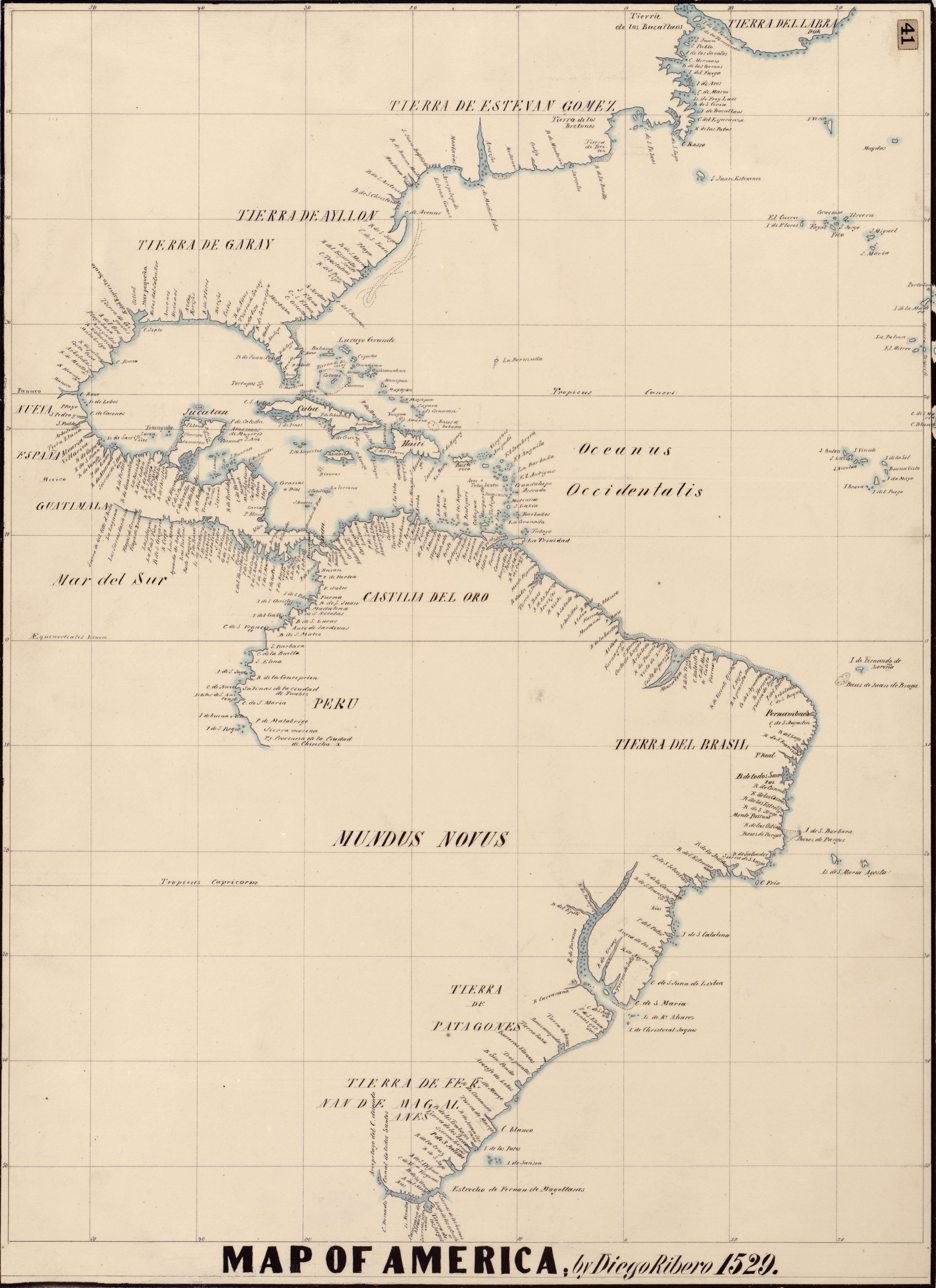
America in Ribeiro's 1529 map

By 1516, Diogo Ribeiro and several other Portuguese navigators and cartographers, conflicting with King Manuel I of Portugal, gathered in Seville to serve the newly crowned Charles V of Spain. Among them were explorers and cartographers Diogo and Duarte Barbosa, Estêvão Gomes, João Serrão, Ferdinand Magellan and Jorge Reinel, cosmographers Francisco and Ruy Faleiro and the Castilian merchant Cristóbal de Haro. Ribeiro started working for Charles I (and V of the Holy Roman Empire) in 1518, as a cartographer at the Casa de Contratación in Seville. Ferdinand Magellan took part in the development of the maps used in the first circumnavigation of the Earth.

On January 10, 1523, he was named Royal Cosmographer and "master in the art of creating maps, astrolabes, and other instruments". He eventually succeeded Sebastian Cabot (who left on a voyage) as the head cartographer. Cabot published his first map in 1544.

In 1524, Ribeiro participated in the Castilian (Spanish) delegation at the Conference of Badajoz, where Castile (in today'sSpain) and Portugal discussed whether the Philippines were on the Castilian or Portuguese side of the Treaty of Tordesillas.

In 1527, Ribeiro finished the Padrón Real, the official (and secret) Spanish map used as a template for the maps in all Spanish ships.

In 1531, he invented a bronze water pump that was able to pump water out ten times faster than previous models.

Ribeiro died on 16 August 1533.

== World map ==
Ribeiro's most important work is the 1527 Padrón Real. There are six copies attributed to Ribeiro, including at the Weimar Grand Ducal Library (1527 Mundus Novus) and at the Vatican Library, in Vatican City (1529 Propaganda Map or Carta Universal). The layout of this mappa mundi is strongly influenced by the information obtained during the Magellan-Elcano circumnavigation of the globe.

Diogo's map delineates very precisely the coasts of Central and South America. It shows the whole east coast of the Americas but of the west coast only the area from Guatemala to Ecuador. Neither Australia nor Antarctica appear, and the Indian subcontinent appears too small. The map shows for the first time, however, the real extent of the Pacific Ocean. It also shows, for the first time in cartography, the North American coast as a continuous one (probably influenced by Estêvão Gomes's explorations in 1524–1525). It also shows the demarcation of the Treaty of Tordesillas.

== See also ==
- Cartography of Latin America

== Notes ==
[n] - Diego Ribero's name also appears as "Diogo Ribeiro" in Portuguese documents.
[r] - An exhibit of Padron Real was March 2002, in "Florida, the Making of a State".
[s] - The main sources include:
