= Estêvão Gomes =

Portuguese explorer

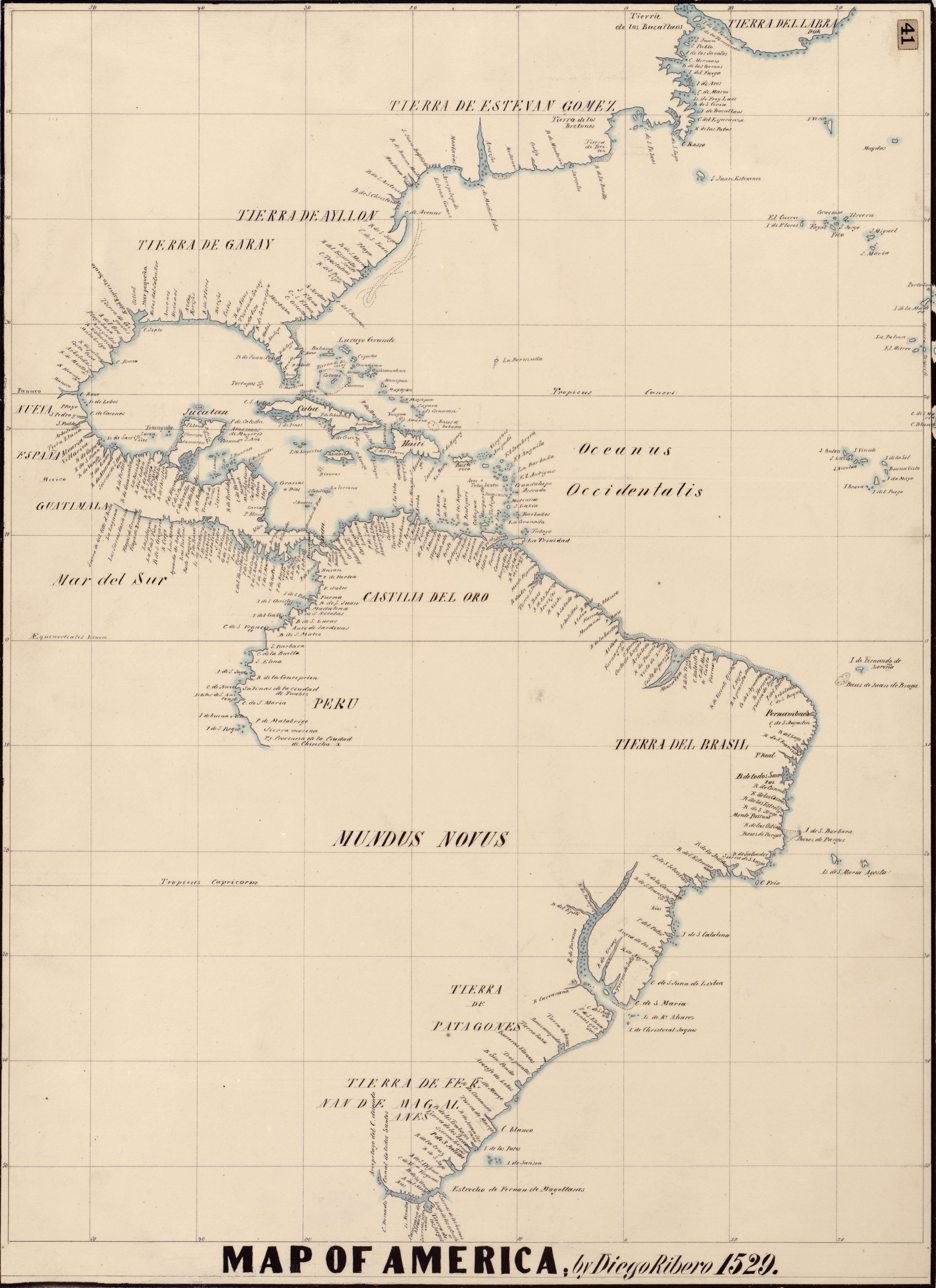
This reprinted excerpt of the 1529 Spanish Royal Map by Diogo Ribeiro includes the northeastern American coast labelled as Tierra de Esteban Gómez.

Estêvão Gomes (c. 1483 – 1538), also known by the Spanish version of his name Esteban Gómez, was a Portuguese explorer. He sailed in the service of Castile in the fleet of Ferdinand Magellan, but deserted the expedition when they had reached the Strait of Magellan and returned to Spain in May 1521. In 1524, he explored the coast of present-day New England and Nova Scotia. As a result of Gomes' expedition, cartographer Diogo Ribeiro was the first to accurately portray North America with a continuous coastline stretching from Florida to Nova Scotia.

== Life ==
Gomes was born in Porto in northern Portugal. He sailed in the Portuguese India Armadas during his youth. In 1518, he moved to Castile, where he was appointed a pilot for the Casa de Contratación in Seville.

=== Magellan expedition ===
In 1519, Gomes sailed with the Magellan expedition as the pilot major of the fleet aboard the San Antonio. His real ambition, however, was to become captain of the ship. Gomes frustration grew when he was passed over for promotion in favor of Magellan's inexperienced nephew, Alvaro de Mesquita. Near the Strait of Magellan, Gomes overpowered Mesquita, took control of the San Antonio and sailed back to Spain in May 1521. Upon their return, Gomes claimed his mutiny was justified by Magellan's abuses and poor management. The mutineers were thrown in jail while their claims were investigated, but within six months all except Mesquita were freed. When Captain Juan Sebastián Elcano returned to Spain in late summer 1522, Gomes was exonerated by accounts from the survivors.

=== North American coast ===
In 1523 Gomes received authorization from the Spanish Crown to search along the North American coast for an alternate passage to Asia that would be quicker and easier than the Strait of Magellan. A 50-ton caravel, La Annunciada, was built for the purpose and set sail from Corunna on 24 September 1524 with a crew of 29 men.

No eyewitness accounts of this expedition have survived. Knowledge of the voyage comes from brief second-hand summaries by contemporary historians Oviedo, Peter Martyr, and Alonzo de Santa Cruz, as well as cartographic information captured by Diogo Ribeiro. Even the general direction they sailed has been disputed. For a long time, it was assumed that Gomes explored the American coast from north to south. More recently, a good case has been made that he started from the Spanish Caribbean and sailed north.

If Gomes proceeded from south to north along the coast, it is likely that he stopped first at Santiago de Cuba to load fresh supplies. From there, the explorers followed the coast from Florida to Labrador, making their most careful survey along the shores of what would become New England. Gomes sailed up the Penobscot River to the future site of Bangor, Maine, naming the waterway "El Rio de Las Gamas". He named other significant landmarks such as "Rio de San Antonio" (now the Hudson River) and "Cabo de las Arenas" (present-day Cape Cod).

While exploring the area of Penobscot, Gomes abducted at least 58 natives and took them back to Spain as evidence of a potentially lucrative slave trade. When he reached Spain in August 1525, Gomes sent word to the king of his return. Peter Martyr claimed that when the message reached court, the word for slaves (esclavos) had been misunderstood to mean cloves (clavos), creating for a moment the false impression that Gomes had found a route to the Orient. When the mistake was cleared up, Charles was upset that the injunction against enslaving American natives had been ignored and ordered them to be freed.

As a result of Gomes' expedition, cartographer Diogo Ribeiro's 1525 Castiglione map was the first to accurately portray North America with a continuous coastline stretching from Florida to Nova Scotia. Ribeiro labeled the region of present-day New England as the "Land of Estêvão Gomes" (Tierra de Esteban Gómez).

=== Later career ===
After his return from North America, Gomes supervised shipbuilding in Corunna until 1528. In 1533, he received a commission to build a proposed Guadalquivir canal, an effort that soon collapsed. In 1535, Gomes joined Pedro de Mendoza's expedition to the Río de la Plata. He was killed by natives of the Paraguay River in 1538.

== See also ==
- Giovanni da Verrazzano
- Lists of explorers and cartographers

== Bibliography ==
- Bergreen, Laurence (2009), Over the Edge of the World: Magellan's Terrifying Circumnavigation of the Globe, Harper Collins.
- Bradley, Peter (2007). "Gomes, Estêvão". The Oxford Companion to World Exploration. Oxford University Press.
- Ellis, Edward Robb (1966), The Epic of New York City.
- Ganong, W.F. (1964), Crucial Maps in the Early Cartography and Place-Nomenclature of the Atlantic Coast of Canada, Toronto: University of Toronto Press.
- Guillemard, Francis Henry Hill (1890), The Life of Ferdinand Magellan, G. Philip & Son.
- Howgego, Raymond John, ed. (2003). "Gomes, Estevão". Encyclopedia of Exploration to 1800. Hordern House. ISBN 1875567364.
- Hunter, Douglas (2010), Half Moon: Henry Hudson and the Voyage that Redrew the Map of the New World, Bloomsbury Publishing, ISBN 978-1-60819-098-0.
- Joyner, Tim (1992). Magellan. Camden, Me.: International Marine. pp. 276–277. ISBN 0-87742-263-X.
- Lawson, Russell M. (2015), The Sea Mark: Captain John Smith's Voyage to New England, University Press of New England, ISBN 9781611687170.
- Quinn, David Beers (1977). North America from earliest discovery to first settlements : the norse voyages to 1612 (1986 ed.). New York: Harper & Row. ISBN 0-06-132061-7. OCLC 832313057.
- Seaver, Kirsten A. (1998). "Norumbega and "Harmonia Mundi" in Sixteenth-Century Cartography". Imago Mundi. 50: 34–58. ISSN 0308-5694. JSTOR 1151390.
- Vigneras, L.A. (1979) [1966]. "Gomes, Estêvão". In Brown, George Williams (ed.). Dictionary of Canadian Biography. Vol. I (1000–1700) (online ed.). University of Toronto Press.
- Weber, David J. (1992). The Spanish frontier in North America. New Haven: Yale University Press. ISBN 0-300-05198-0. OCLC 25373147.
- Portuguese Exploration along the Northeast Coast of North America, Washington, DC: Library of Congress, 2023.
- Francoeur, Arsène; et al. (2017), Estéban Gomez et Mathieu Dacosta: Marins Noirs sur l'Atlantique (XVIe et XVIIe Siècles) (in French), Edilivre, ISBN 9782414167166.
