= Salviati Planisphere =

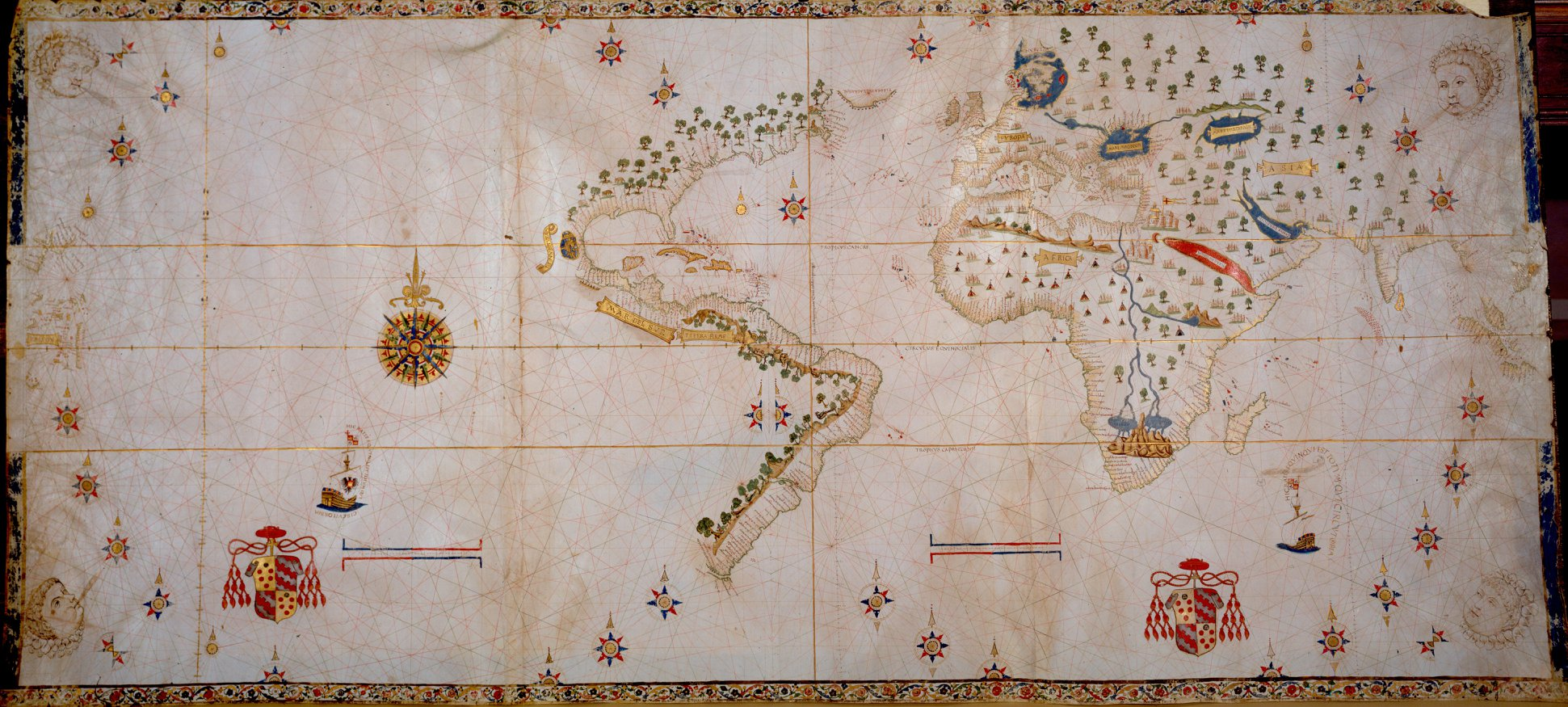
The Salviati Planisphere

The Salviati Planisphere is a world map showing the Spanish view of the Earth's surface at the time of the map's creation, c. 1525, and includes the eastern coasts of North and South America and the Straits of Magellan. Rather than include imagined material in unexplored areas—as was customary—it is content to leave them blank, inviting future exploration.

It is believed to have been drawn by Nuño García de Toreno, the head of the Casa de la Contratación, in Seville. It takes its name from Cardinal Giovanni Salviati, the papal nuncio to Spain from 1525–30, who was given it by Holy Roman Emperor Charles V, also King of Spain at the time.

It is currently located at the Biblioteca Medicea Laurenziana, in Florence, Italy.

== See also ==
- Padrón Real
