= Relaciones geográficas =

16th-century questionnaires in the Spanish Empire

The Relaciones geográficas were a series of reports based on questionnaires distributed to the lands of King Philip II of Spain in the Viceroyalty of New Spain and other parts of North and South America. They were completed, upon his command, from 1579 to 1585. This was a direct response to the reforms imposed by the Ordenanzas, ordinances, of 1573.

== Format ==
The questionnaires had upward of fifty questions that requested information on various aspects of the Spanish colonial life in each region or major town, in order to govern it more effectively. Thus, the questionnaires had more of an administrative and functional purpose as opposed to intellectual gain. The reports are often considered the first statistical study of the New World, since they attempted to chart the lands, peoples, and trade routes. The value of these surveys continues to grow over time due to their being first-person information.

== Purpose ==
The extensive reports have provided incredibly rich information with regard to 16th century ethnic groups in Mesoamerica. The questionnaires included questions regarding politics, taxes paid, the natural environment and resources, population history, settlement patterns, the language, markets and trade, native history and customs, maps, and the progress of the missionary work program. These maps were created by indigenous people, sailors, local officials, and other individuals in New Spain. Some of them that were requested were often commissioned by artists and have now been linked to the Casta paintings of the period.

== Result ==
These surveys were reported back to Spain's King Phillip II and allowed the Spanish monarchy to have better control over the people and the politics in the colonies. However, not all major cities and regions are accounted for because not all local officials returned their answers or perhaps their response did not survive. Along with this, since all people were allowed to send in a map it showed the bias of each social class and represented common issues of the time. Nevertheless, this scientific process of data collection and statistics essentially built a bridge between two continents.

Today, many of the manuscript versions of these reports are found in four different locations: The General Archive of the Indies in Seville, the Real Academia de la Historia in Madrid, the Benson Library at the University of Texas at Austin, and the University of Glasgow Library.

== See also ==
- Cartography of Latin America
- Mesoamerican literature
