= Ochoa Álvarez de Isasaga =

Spanish nobleman (1470–1555)

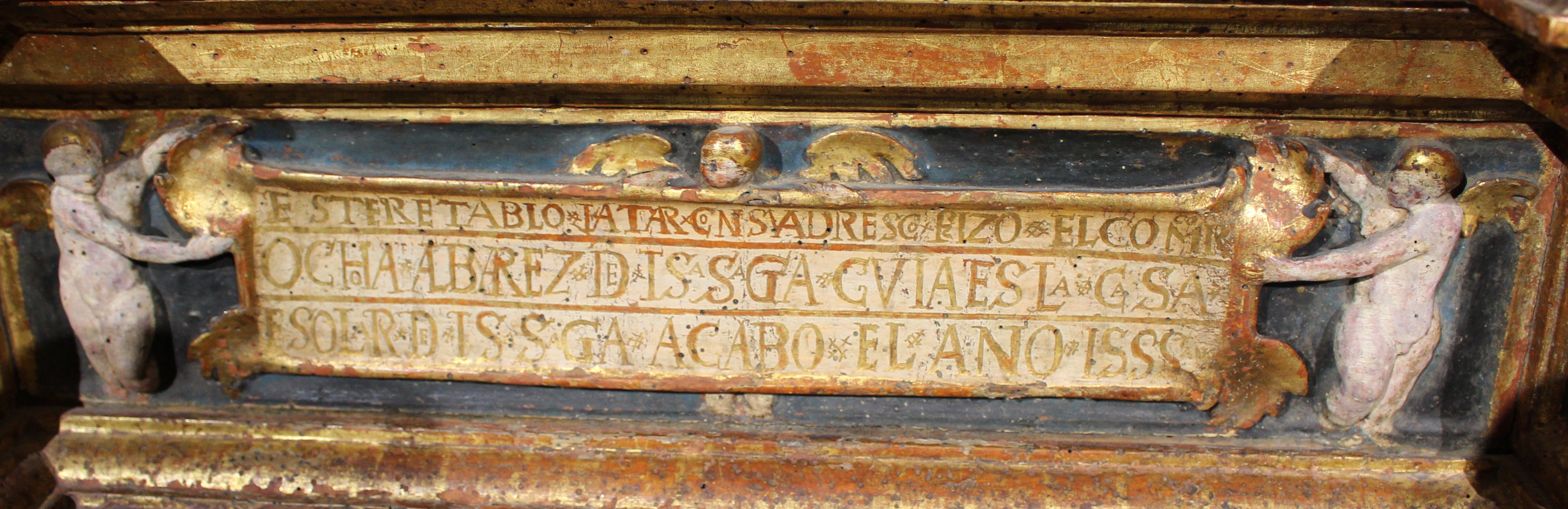
Burial Crypt of Ochoa de Isásaga

Ochoa Álvarez de Isásaga (also spelled "Ysasaga") was born around 1470 in Villafranca de Ordizia, Spain. "Ochoa" (Basque: Otxoa) is a Basque patronymic name originally given in Medieval Spain meaning "the wolf."

Born into one of the oldest noble houses in Europe, Isásaga began working for the interests of the Catholic Monarchs, Ferdinand II and Isabella I and later on rose to the seat of power for the Spanish Empire at a time when Spain was the unrivaled superpower of the world.

Very early on, Isásaga won the trust of many kings, queens, princes and nobles of his time. By the time he was 27 years old, Isásaga was named Factor for the Crown, and he was instrumental in the rise and longevity of the Spanish Empire. Later, named Chief of the Supreme Council of the Indies, and Knight of the Order of Santiago.

== Ancient Noble House of Isásaga (Casa e Solar de Isásaga) ==
The Solar House of Isásaga (Casa e Solar de Isásaga) is an ancient Basque noble house that descends from tribal heads of both the pre-Roman 1st century AD Vascones and the earlier 1st century BC Aquitani people. Isásaga was born into the system of titles and honors that make up the Spanish nobility of the former kingdoms that constitute modern Spain (Castile and Aragon).

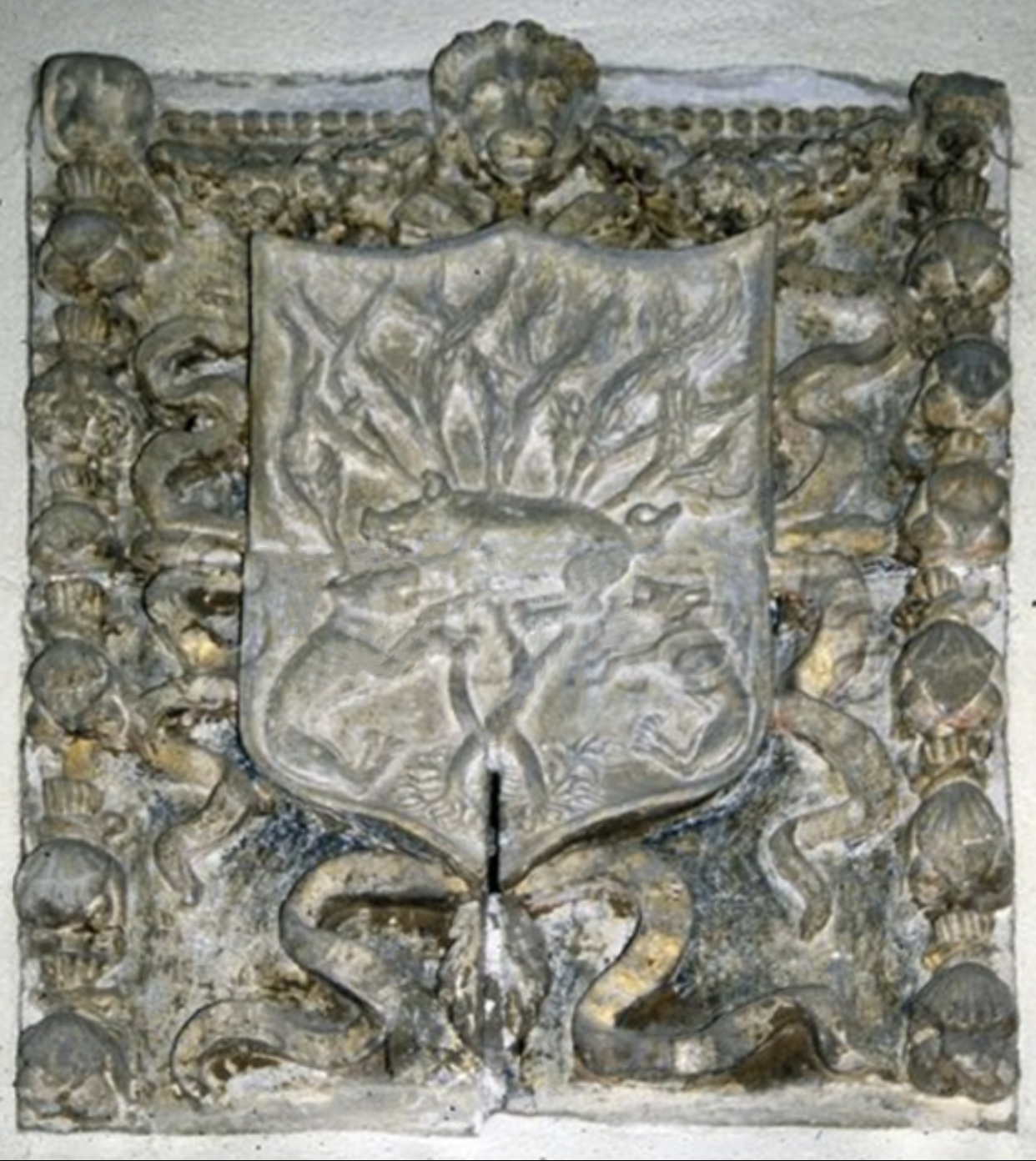
Isásaga Coat of Arms

== House Isásaga coat of arms and origins ==
House Isásaga, originally from the town of Oñate (Guipúzcoa), their coat of arms is displayed on their weapons, which display a field of gold, with a broom of sinople, called in Basque "Isásaga," and a wild boar of saber at the foot and two dogs preying upon it, one at the boar's neck and at the boar's leg.

The Isásaga coat of arms proclaims the following values: Gold is the symbol of the Sun, origin of life, its spiritual characteristics correspond to faith, clemency, temperance, charity and justice, on the other hand this enamel points to the family with happiness, love, nobility and splendor, that is, it is the noblest of metals. The saber-toothed wild boar symbolizes bravery and a willingness to fight to the death. The dogs are the emblem of faithfulness and guardianship in heraldry. The warring dogs and the boar symbolize the inner struggle of the brave and the stubborn versus the balance of faithfulness and guardianship.

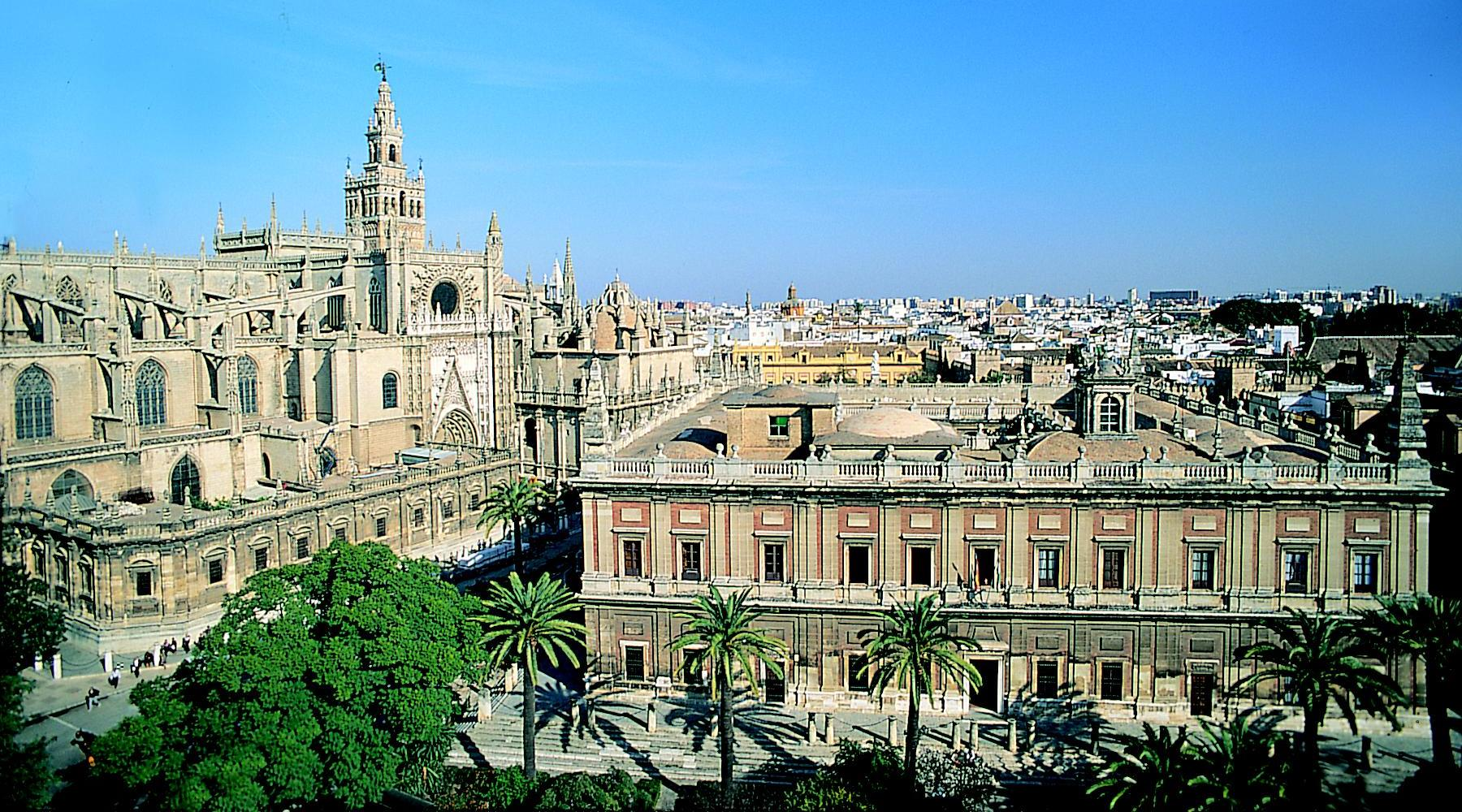
Although the Casa de Contratación was not located in a specific building, its documents can now be seen in the Archive of the Indies in Seville.

== Spanish Empire, Chief of the Supreme Council of the Indies ==
Isásaga's loyalty, political sagacity, and shrewd financial mind made him one of the most trusted men in the Spanish Empire, leading to his meteoric rise to several key royal positions across Europe.

=== Appointment to the Casa de Contratación ===
Perhaps one of Isásaga's most notable appointments was granted by King Ferdinand "the Catholic" and Queen Joanna I of Castile in 1509 who named him "factor" (person who collected the rents for the Crown). Isásaga eventually was named "Chief Official" of the Casa de la Contratación de Indias located in Seville. In theory, no Spaniard could sail anywhere without the approval of the Casa.

As the Chief of the Supreme Council of the Indies, officially, the Royal and Supreme Council of the Indies (Real y Supremo Consejo de las Indias), Isásaga acted as head of the most important administrative organ of the Spanish Empire for the Americas and the Philippines.

In his position as Chief, Isásaga oversaw the collection of gold, silver and other resources from the New World. On behalf of the Crown, Isásaga held absolute power over the New World wealth, with the Council of the Indies acting as the undisputed administrative and advisory body for those overseas realms.

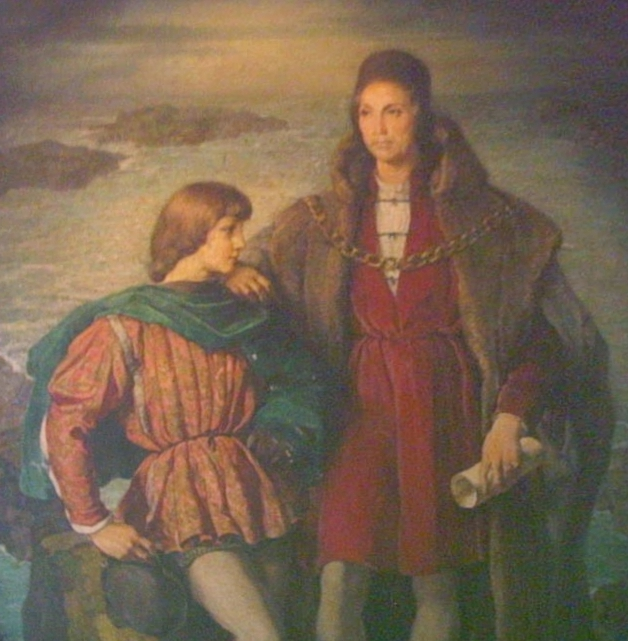
Christopher and Diego Columbus

=== Authority taken from Christopher Columbus for tyrannical abuses ===
Prior to power given to Isásaga as Chief Official of the Council of the Indies, Queen Isabella had granted extensive authority to Christopher Columbus, but then withdrew that authority, and established direct royal control, putting matters of the Indies in the hands of Royal and Supreme Council of the Indies.

=== Treasury and sword ===
After the death of Ferdinand II, Charles became the King of Spain (Castile and Aragon) in 1516, and later becoming "Charles V," Holy Roman Emperor in 1519, over one of the largest empires, the Spanish Empire, in European and world history.

It was during this period that the Supreme Council of the Indies, under Isásaga, was at the peak of power. The Bishop of Badajoz, Ruiz de la Mota, who was an influential member of the Royal Council and declared that the Council of the Indies was to be the empire's "treasury and sword" - with Isásaga as its head.

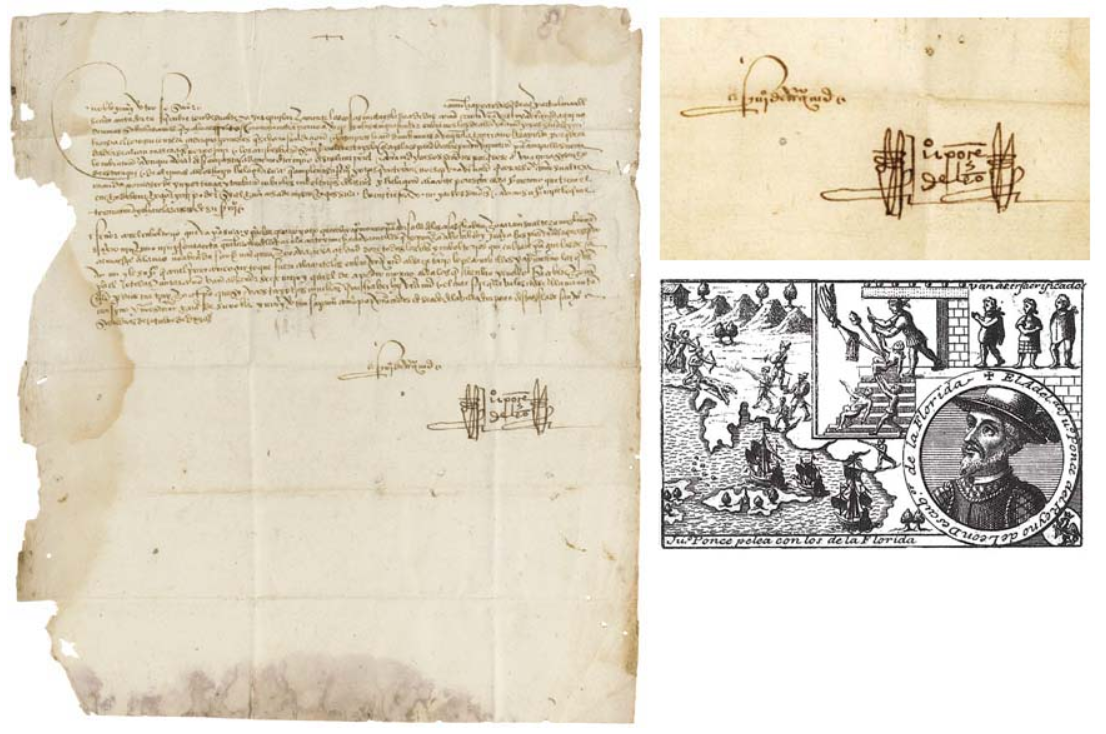
Handwritten Letter from Ponce de León to Ochoa de Isásaga

=== Letters to Ochoa de Isásaga, Chief of the Supreme Council of the Indies ===
Regarding his time as Chief, Isásaga received many letters from notable explorers in the New World, many of which are preserved to this day including the only known hand-written letters in Juan Ponce de León's own hand, a Spanish explorer and conquistador known for leading the first official European expedition to Florida and seeking the "Fountain of Youth."

- Letter written by Juan Ponce de León which sold for $515,500 USD:
  - One of the earliest extant letters from the New World and one of only five known letters of Juan Ponce de León and the only known letter written in Juan Ponce de León's own private hand.
  - Describes the early phases of Spanish exploration and conquest in the years immediately following Columbus's epic voyages.

Recently, Christie's auction house sold six letters written to Ochoa de Isásaga of the Supreme Council of the Indies, from four different Spanish Conquistadores, two of whom had sailed on Columbus's second voyage which sold for $138,000 USD. The letters were addressed to "Noble e Virtuoso Comendador Ochoa de Isásaga, Factor de la casa de Contratacion en Sevilla" while Isásaga was the Chief of the Council, penned sometime between 1508 and 1514. Juan Ponce de León's letter describes the Indian Revolts of 1511 and 1513.

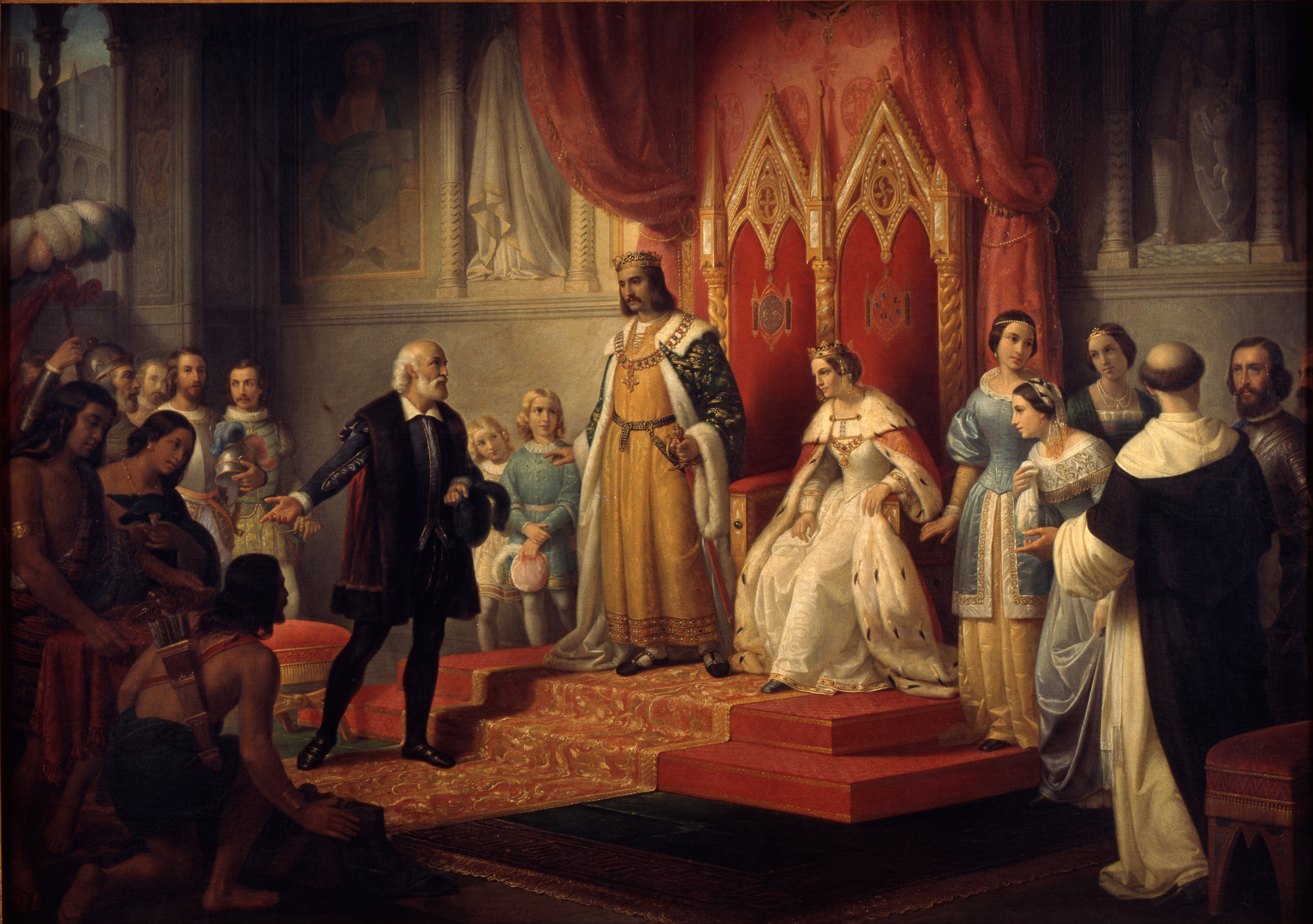
At the Court of the Catholic Monarchs

== Close ties to European royalty ==
Isásaga's close relationships with the European kings, queens, princes and noble houses is evident by the voluminous public and private correspondence that have been preserved between Ochoa Alvarez de Isásaga and the various kings, queens, princes and nobility across Europe.

Among the lengthy list of royal letters are letters from Queen Isabella I of Castille, King Ferdinand II of Aragon, Queen Joanna I of Castille, Queen Maria, Queen Consort of Manuel I, King of Portugal, Queen Regnant of Portugal, Doña María I, Charles V Holy Roman Emperor, Catherine of Aragon, wife of Henry VIII, Queen Mary I of England, King of France, Francis I, Holy Roman Empress Isabella of Portugal Queen of Spain and Germany, Lady of the Netherlands and Queen of Italy, and many others.

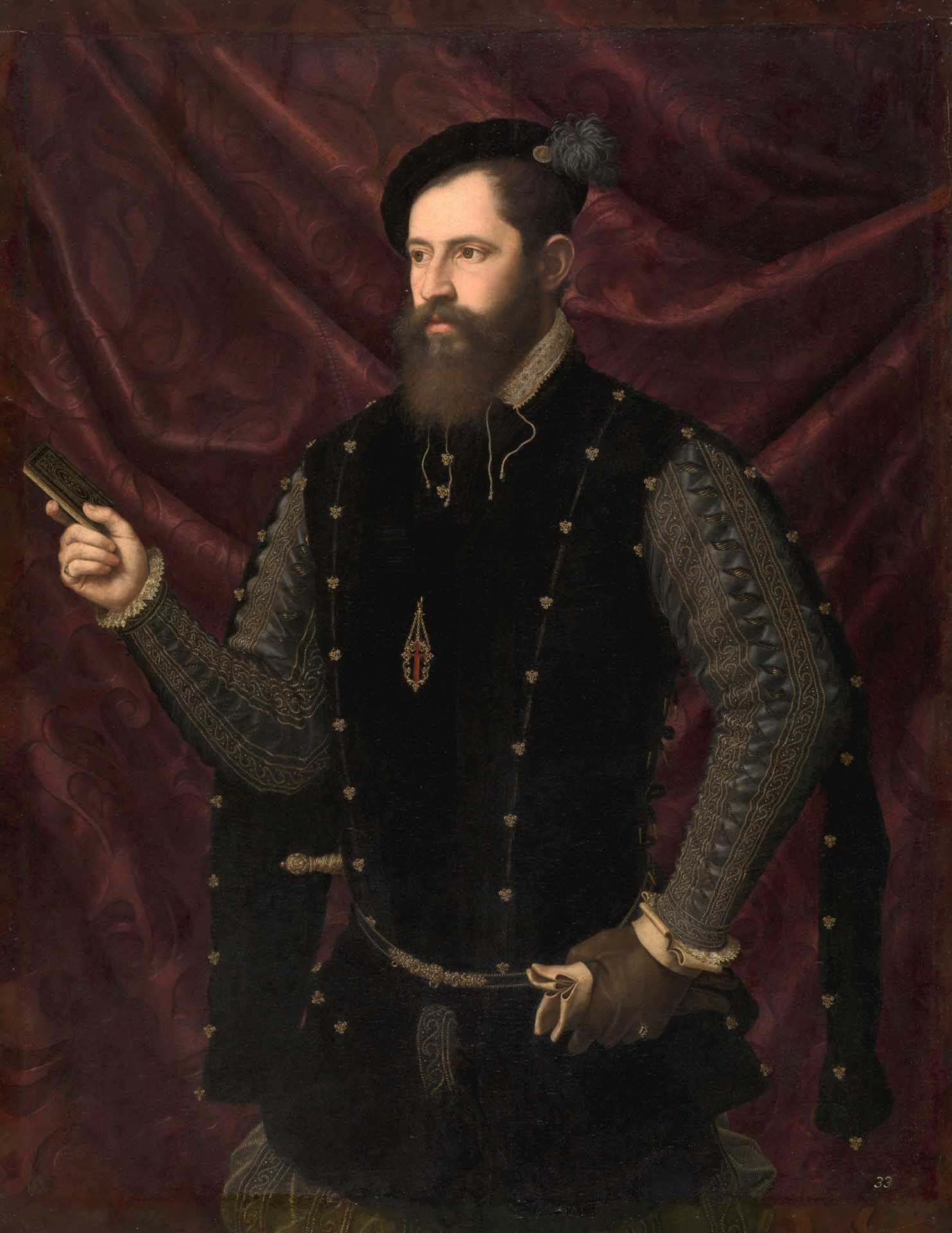
Isásaga was a Knight of the Order of Santiago

== Knight of the Order of Santiago ==
In 1510, King Ferdinand II granted Isásaga Knighthood in the Order of Santiago (Orden de Santiago) in gratitude for Isásaga's service to the Crown.

Cross of Saint James as used by the Order of Santiago

=== St. James' Cross ===
Isásaga wore the Order's insignia, a red cross resembling a sword, with the shape of a fleur-de-lis on the hilt and the arms. The three fleurs-de-lis represent the "honor without stain", which is in reference to the moral features of the Apostle's character.

=== Council of War ===
On January 10, 1523, Emperor Charles V wrote a letter to Isásaga expressing gratitude for Isásaga's service with the Holy Roman Empire's Council of War, along with Isásaga's brother, García Álvarez de Isásaga.

At this time in the early sixteenth century, the balance of power in Western Europe was a delicate dance between France, the Holy Roman Empire (modern day Germany) and England. There were three strong personalities who each sought the advantage: King François I of France, the Habsburg Holy Roman Emperor Charles V and King Henry VIII of England.

During this time, both the Spanish Empire and the Holy Roman Empire's relations with France remained tense. Charles V elicited the help of Isásaga to broker the peace between France and the Holy Roman Empire.

== Hostage of the Sons of the King François I of France, Dauphin François, the third Duke of Brittany and Henry II of France ==
As one of the most trusted men in Europe, Isásaga, Knight of the Order of Santiago ("Honor Without Stain") was entreated to personally return of the sons of the King of France in 1530.

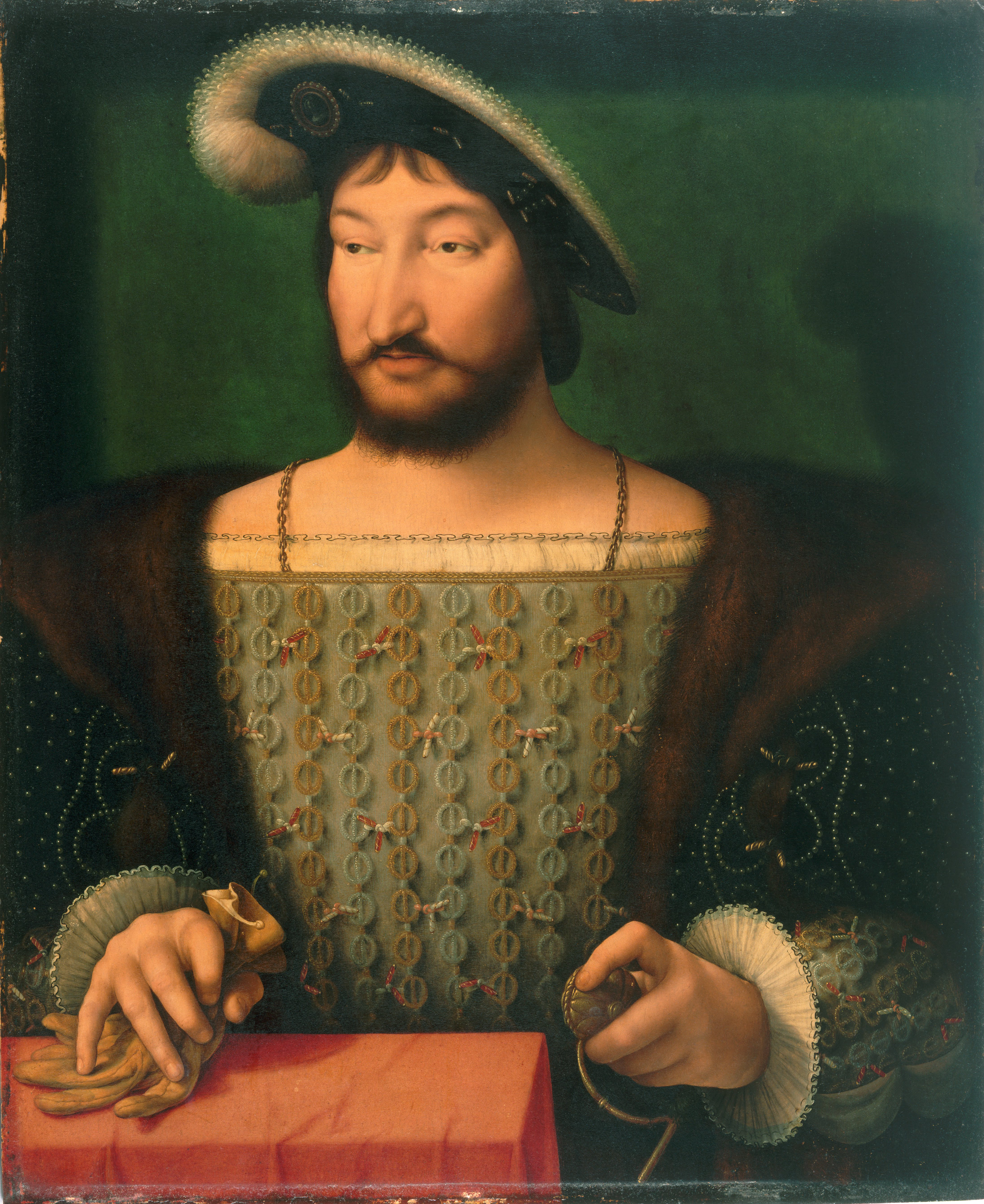
Francis I, King of France

=== King Francis taken prisoner ===
In February of 1525, King Francis I of France and Charles V, Holy Roman Emperor captured the King of France, and held prisoner in Pavia and later in Spain. The King of France offered a cash ransom in exchange for his release.

But the Emperor, under the advice and counsel of Isásaga who served on the Council of War, insisted that all the territories formerly belonging to his great-grandfather, Charles the Bold be returned, including the return of the Province of Burgundy.

Since Francis I was being held by the Emperor, the French King's mother, Louise of Savoy, acted as regent in his stead. Negotiations ensured between Louise and Charles V, but Louis refused to secede any French territory.

=== Treaty of Madrid of 1526 ===
Things for France took a dark turn when suddenly, during his captivity, Francis I became gravely ill, and ultimately, Louise of Savoy, King Francis' mother agree to hand over Burgundy and the other disputed French territory. The agreement was signed on January 14, 1526 known as "the Treaty of Madrid."

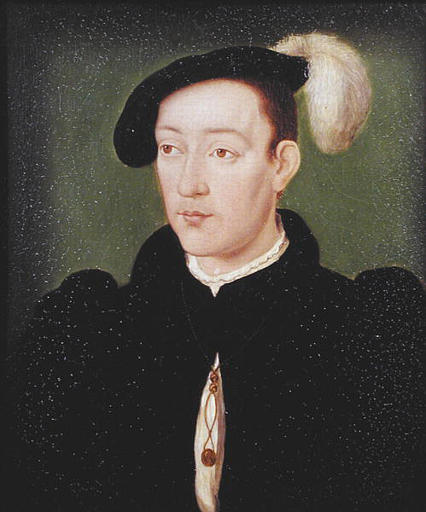
François III de Bretagne - Dauphin de France

The treaty heavily favored the Holy Roman Empire, and King Francis I returned all French territories won by Charles the Bold. France also lost their rights to Milan, Genoa and Naples.

=== Royal marriage between France and the Holy Roman Empire ===
France further agreed to abandon any feudal claims to Artois and Flanders. In addition to the return of these territories, Francis I agreed to marry the Emperor's sister Eleanor of Austria.

=== More crusades ===
France also agreed to provide a French naval fleet to accompany Charles V to Rome for his Imperial coronation and agreed to join the Emperor on a crusade against the German Lutherans and the Ottoman Turks.

=== Hostage assurance ===
Although the treaty was signed, Charles V demanded extra assurances from France which included taking the two sons of the King of France hostage. The two boys were the Dauphin François (9 years old) and Henri, duc d'Orléans (7 years old). The nations agreed that the boys were to be held hostage in Spain until the terms of the treaty was fulfilled.

=== French royal sons taken hostage ===
On February 17, 1526, King Francis I handed the boys over to Charles V as hostages. The boys were given to Charles V in the middle of the Bidasoa River in Spain and under the walls of Fuenterrabia, a small Spanish town in the Basque region.

To ensure the boys safety, Isásaga ordered all people to be cleared from the bay for ten miles on either side. 1000 troops were placed on guard. The Kings met at the platform, Francis I was exchanged for his two sons.

Charles V, Emperor of the Holy Roman Empire

=== Trust placed in Isásaga by Holy Roman Emperor Charles V and King François I of France ===
Already in his retirement in Ordizia but still acting as a mediator between the various European royal courts, Charles V and Francis I both trusted Isásaga to ensure the safe return of the hostages.

On July 2, 1530, Isásaga traveled to Fuenterrabia to Spain to personally oversee the safe return of the two French princes, Francis III, now 13, and Henri, duc d'Orléans, now 11.

Isásaga arrived to meet King Francis I with the news that he brought the boys. Per Charles V's instructions, Isásaga delivered the princes and his future wife, Eleanor of Austria, to a small abbey near Villeneuve-de-Marsan, where just before dawn, King Francis I and Eleanor were married.

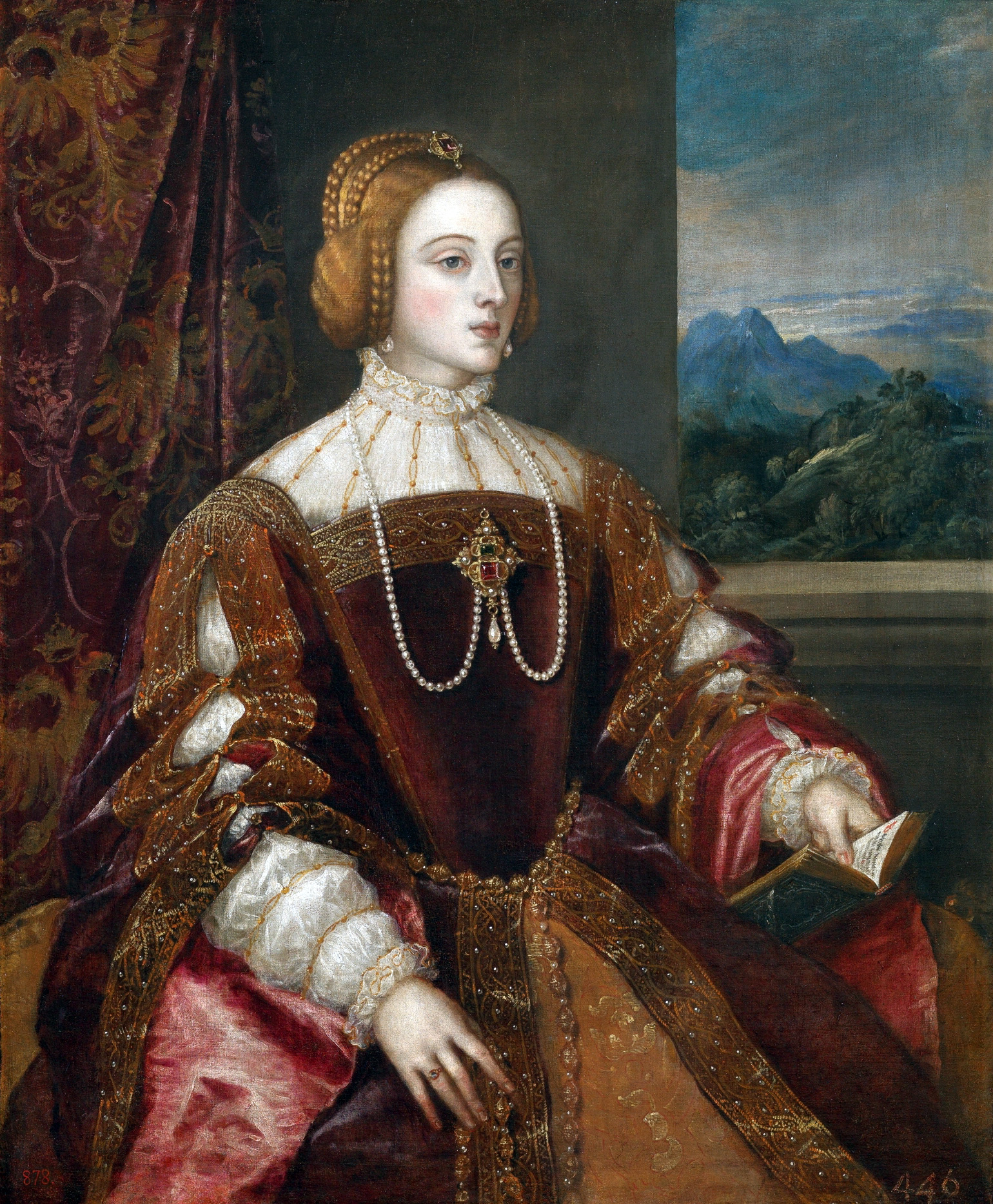
Empress Isabel of Portugal

=== Letter from Empress of the Carnation to Isásaga, Knight of the Order of Santiago ===
Regarding Isásaga's participation, Holy Roman Empress Isabella of Portugal Queen of Spain and Germany, Lady of the Netherlands and Queen of Italy wrote a letter to him in gratitude for his role and for the safe return of the French princes.

== Post-retirement activities ==
While in retirement, Isásaga remained in active council for the Emperor and Empress of the Holy Roman Empire, and the kings, queens, princes, and nobles across Europe.

Ochoa Alvarez de Isásaga never forgot his province, nor Villafranca his place of origin. In 1516 after voluntarily leaving his work in Seville, he retired to Guipúzcoa to work for the interests of the province.

He retired in the province and Villafranca, he made his will and last will before the notary Ochoa de Urdaneta in 1548 but continued to live a full and productive life for many more years. After 1548, Isásaga devoted his time to the affairs of his family, and to the local needs of the village, spending his final years to carry out these tasks.

== Death ==
In 1555, Isásaga died peacefully in his hometown of Villafranca, the city of his birth, at the age of 85 years old.

== Other notable Isásagas ==
Pedro de Isásaga was commander of Rhodes in 1507, who was great friend of Christopher Columbus, he was appointed to replace León Pinelo in the position of official judge, pointing out 100,000 reais in 1515.

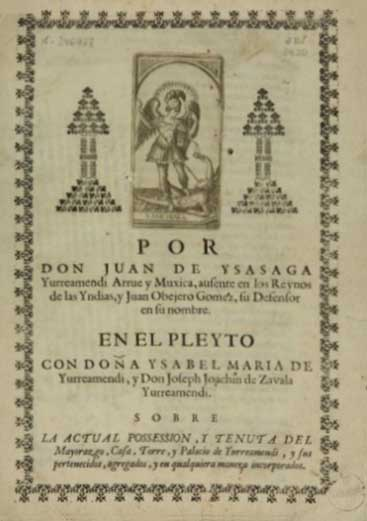
Juan López de Isásaga

Juan López de Isásaga was field master and knight of the Order of Calatrava, in 1617.

Buenaventura de Isásaga of the order of Calatrava, governor of the province of Pisco, Peru, Lord of Sajuela, Miranda de Ebro, around the year 1707.

Lope de Isásaga, 1493 described as "a man of very relevant gifts," who in the early years of the sixteenth century was commissioned by Ferdinand the Catholic to negotiate with the Portuguese and resolve the questions that existed in Morocco between them and the Castilians, especially in relation to the possession and dominion of Agadir, better known in our days with the name of Santa Cruz de Mar Pequeña.

Notably, like Ochoa de Isásaga, Lope was given Spanish equivalent (Latin lupus) of the Basque given name "Ochoa" (meaning "the Wolf"), was born among Gascon lords in the High Middle Ages.

Martín de Isásaga, nephew of Ochoa de Isásaga, Spanish Conquistador, Nobleman of Spanish Empire, knight of the Order of Santiago, traveled to the New World in the Second Voyage of Columbus 1493.

García Álvarez de Isásaga, brother of Ochoa de Isásaga, served on the Holy Roman Empire's Council of War in 1523.
