= Cartography of Latin America =

Cartography of Latin America, map-making of the realms in the Western Hemisphere, was an important aim of European powers expanding into the New World. Both the Spanish Empire and the Portuguese Empire began mapping the realms they explored and settled. They also speculated on the lands that were marked terra incognita. Indigenous groups created maps of their territories, some of which predated the arrival of the Europeans. Maps for Spain also projected "its particular sense of order, religion, and justice, or what was understood as policía in its new colonies." Maps could be a form of propaganda; empires used maps as a means to assert sovereignty over territory, even when the situation on the ground did not merit it. The Spanish crown mandated the creation of reports from indigenous towns in New Spain, the Relaciones geográficas, a major state-directed project for gathering information. with written descriptions and usually a map. A useful collection of articles pointing to some major issues in New World cartography has recently appeared. When other European powers began exploring and settling the zones that Spain and Portugal had claimed as their own, maps began to delineate the boundaries between empires. As Latin America nation-states coalesced following independence in the early nineteenth century, map making was a standard national project.

== Gallery ==
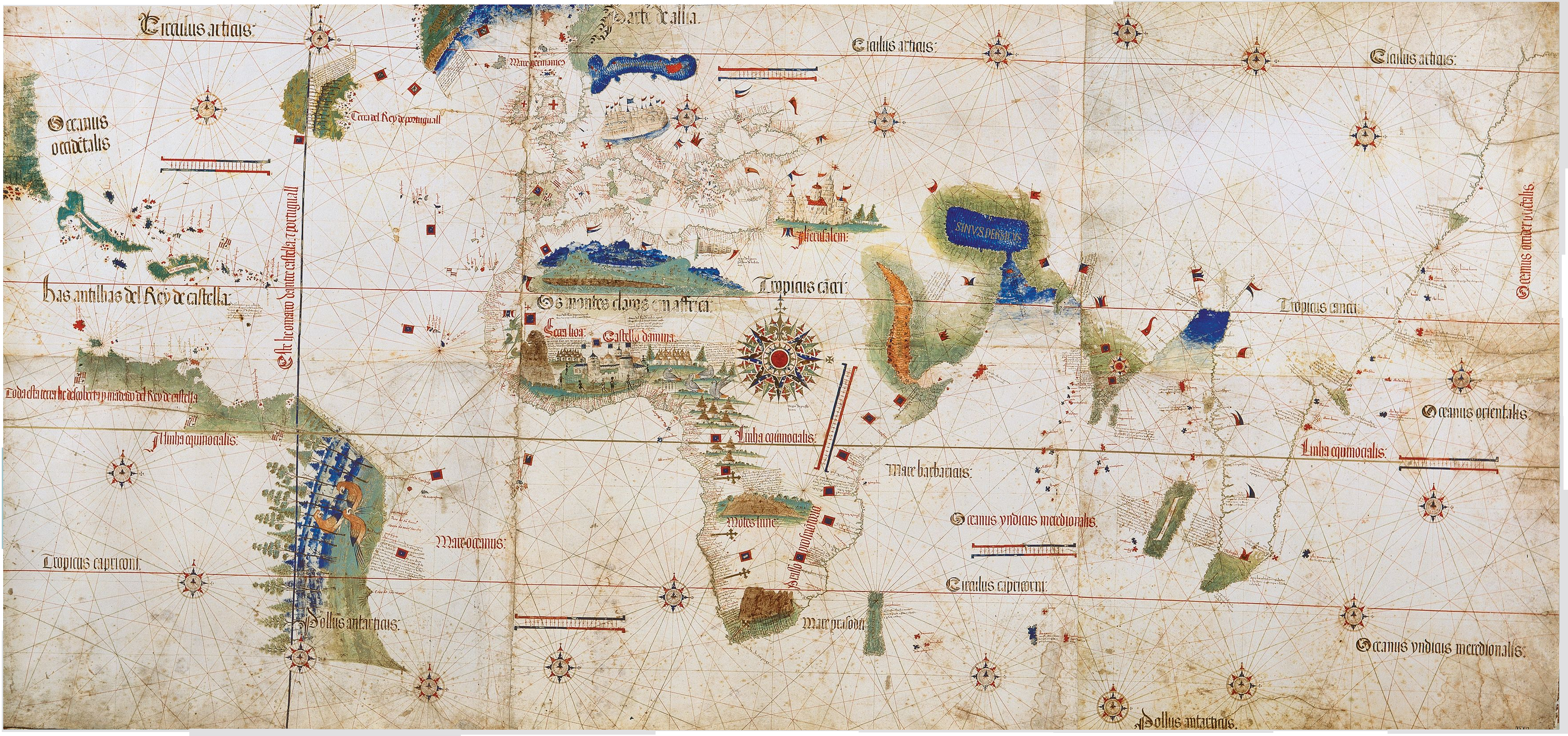
Map showing the line of the Treaty of Tordesillas. 1502. Alberto Cantino.

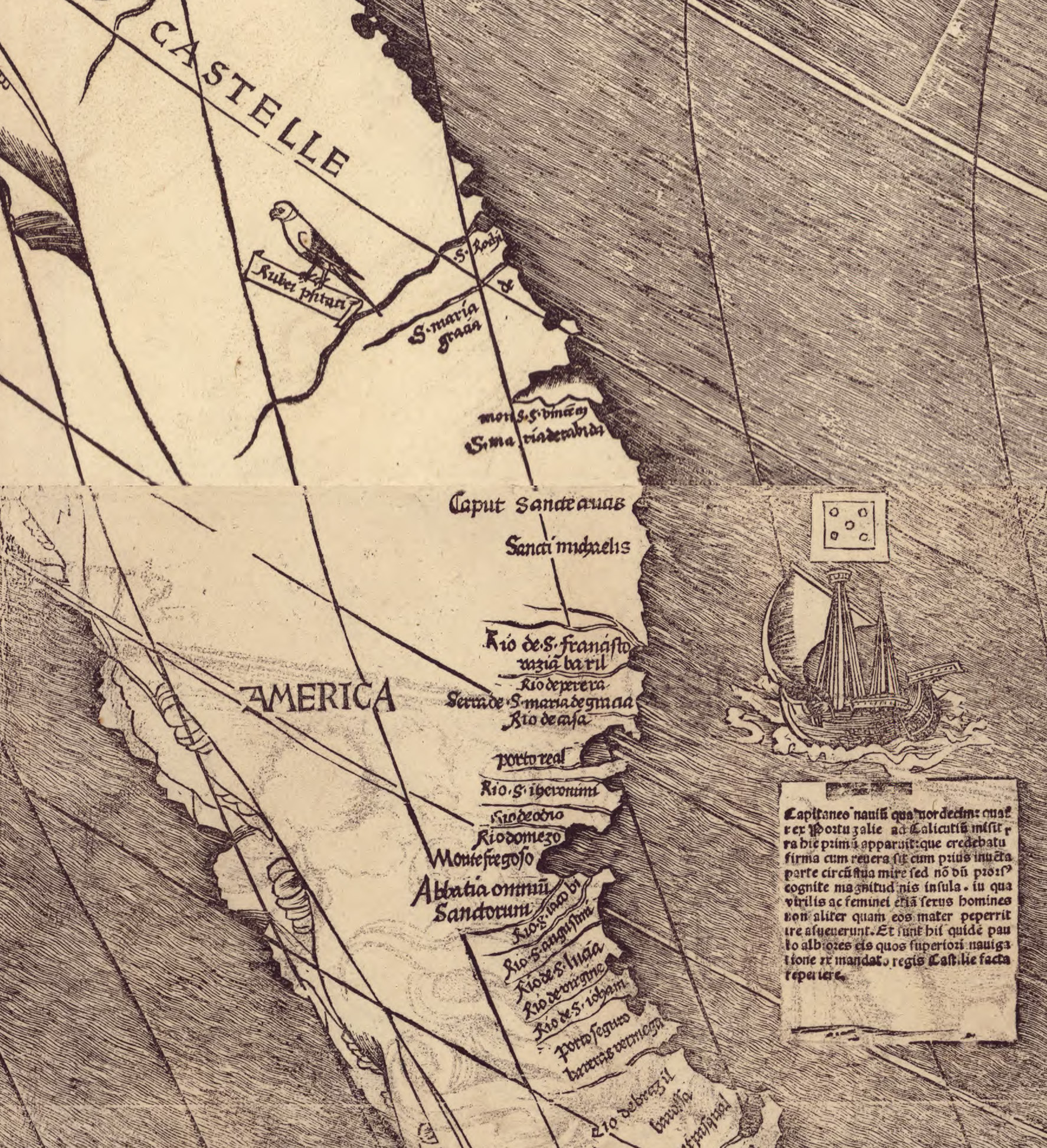
Detail of the Waldseemüller Map, showing the name "America". 1507.

Portuguese map of Brazil by Lopo Homem (c. 1519) showing the coast and natives extracting brazilwood, as well as Portuguese ships

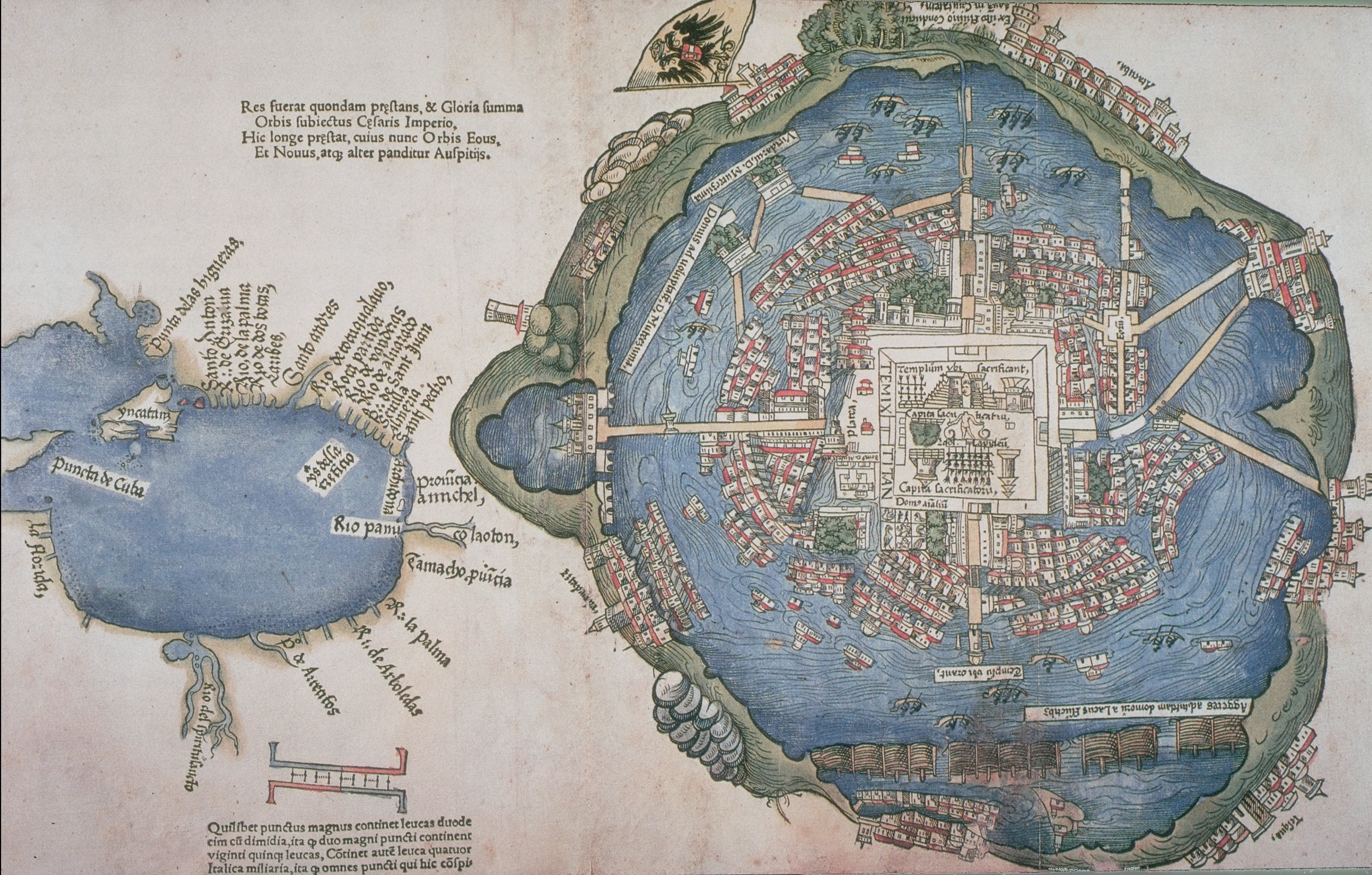
Tenochtitlan 1524.

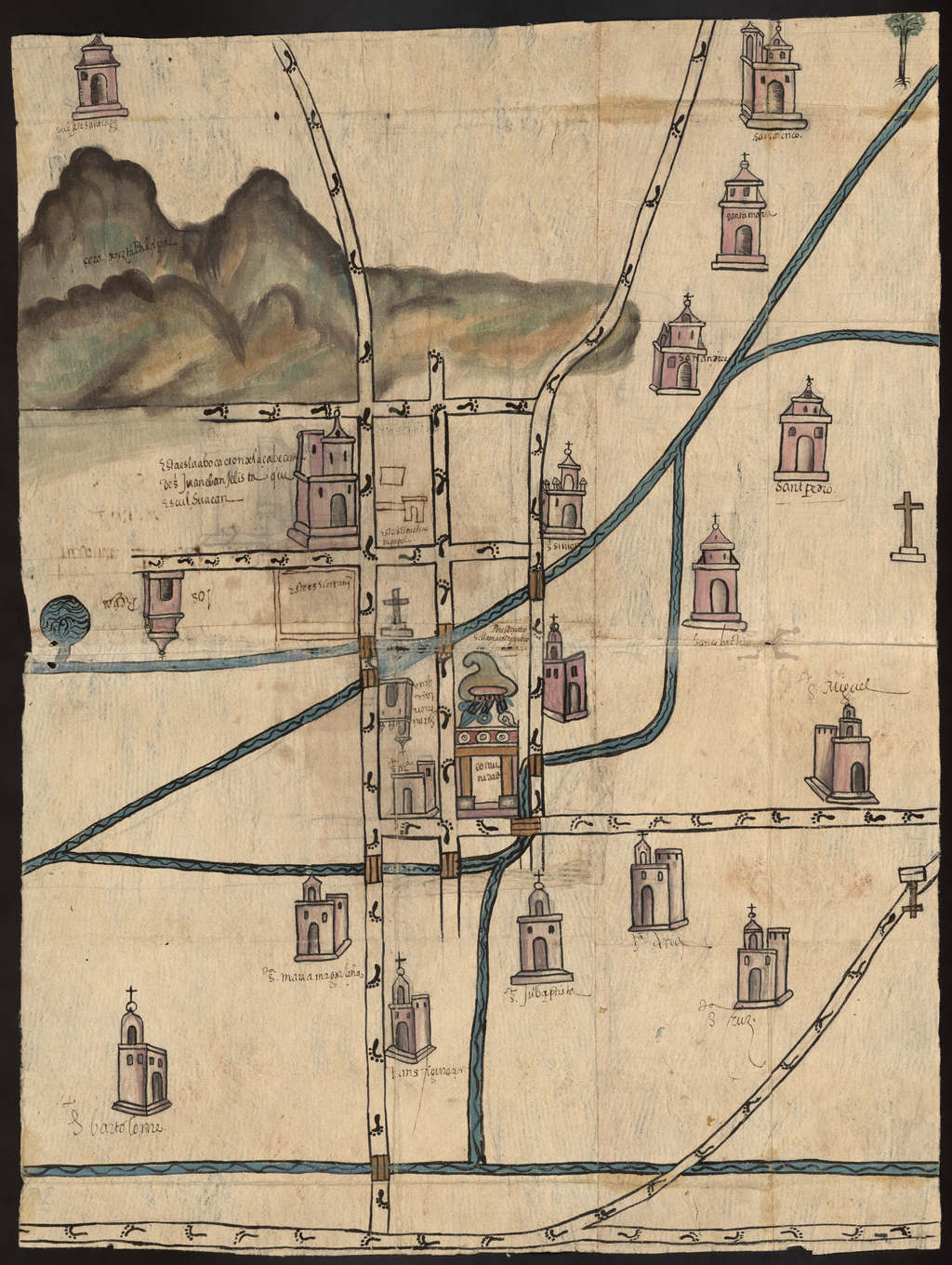
Map of the Relación geográfica of Culhuacan, Mexico. 1580.

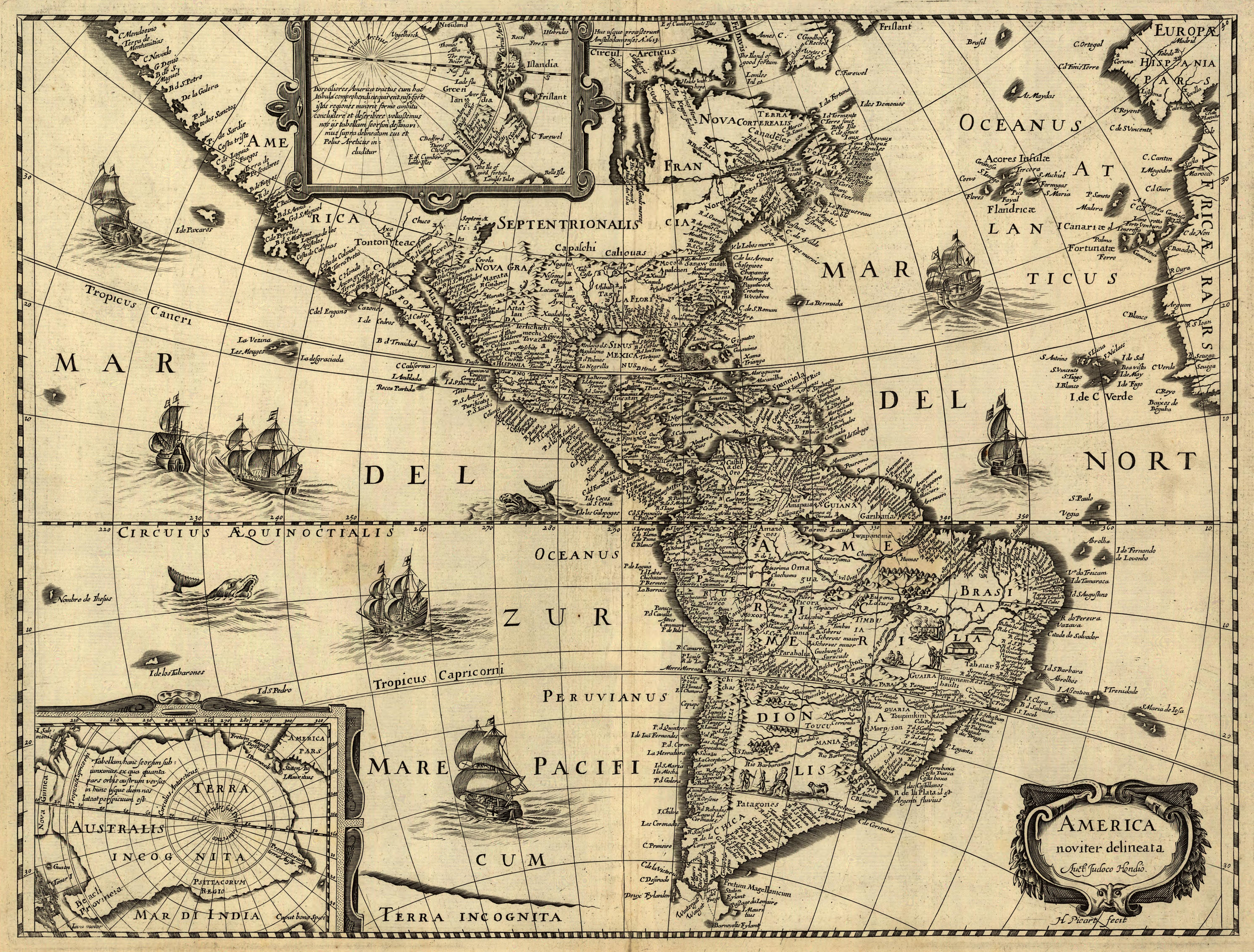
Americas. c. 1640. Dutch. Jodocus Hondius

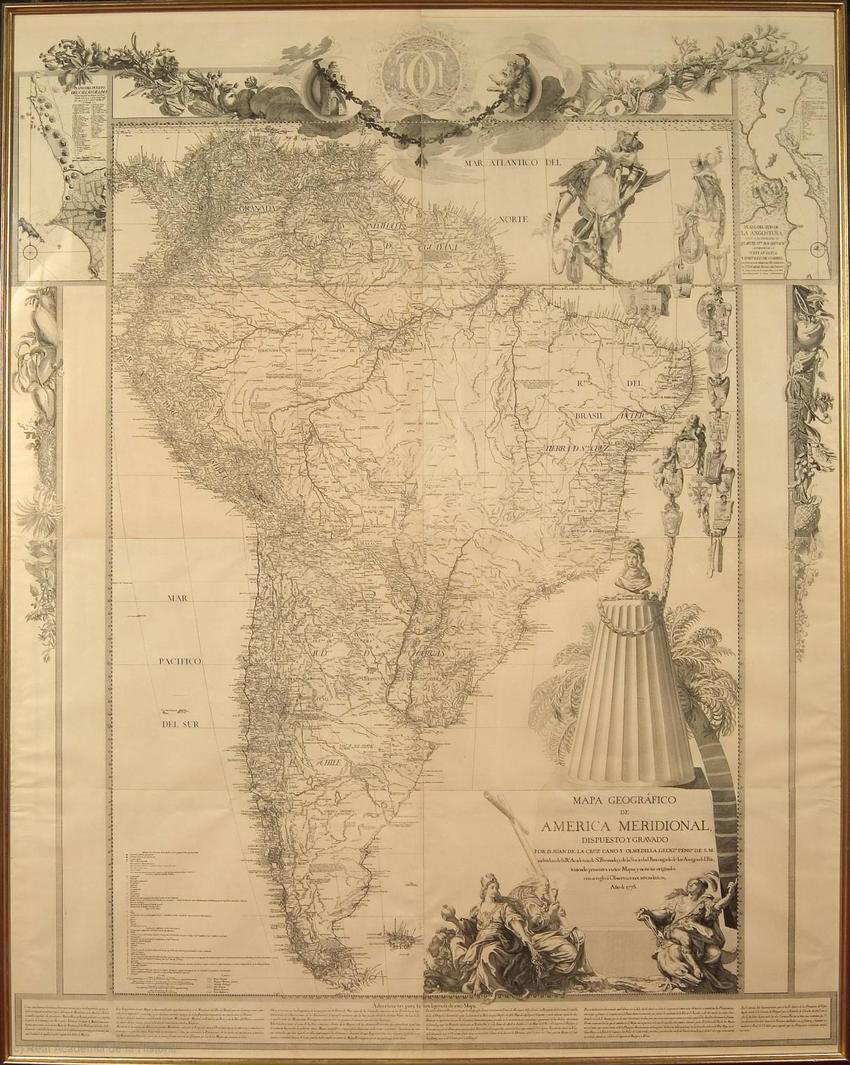
Map of America Meridional. 1771. Juan de la Cruz Cano y Olmedilla

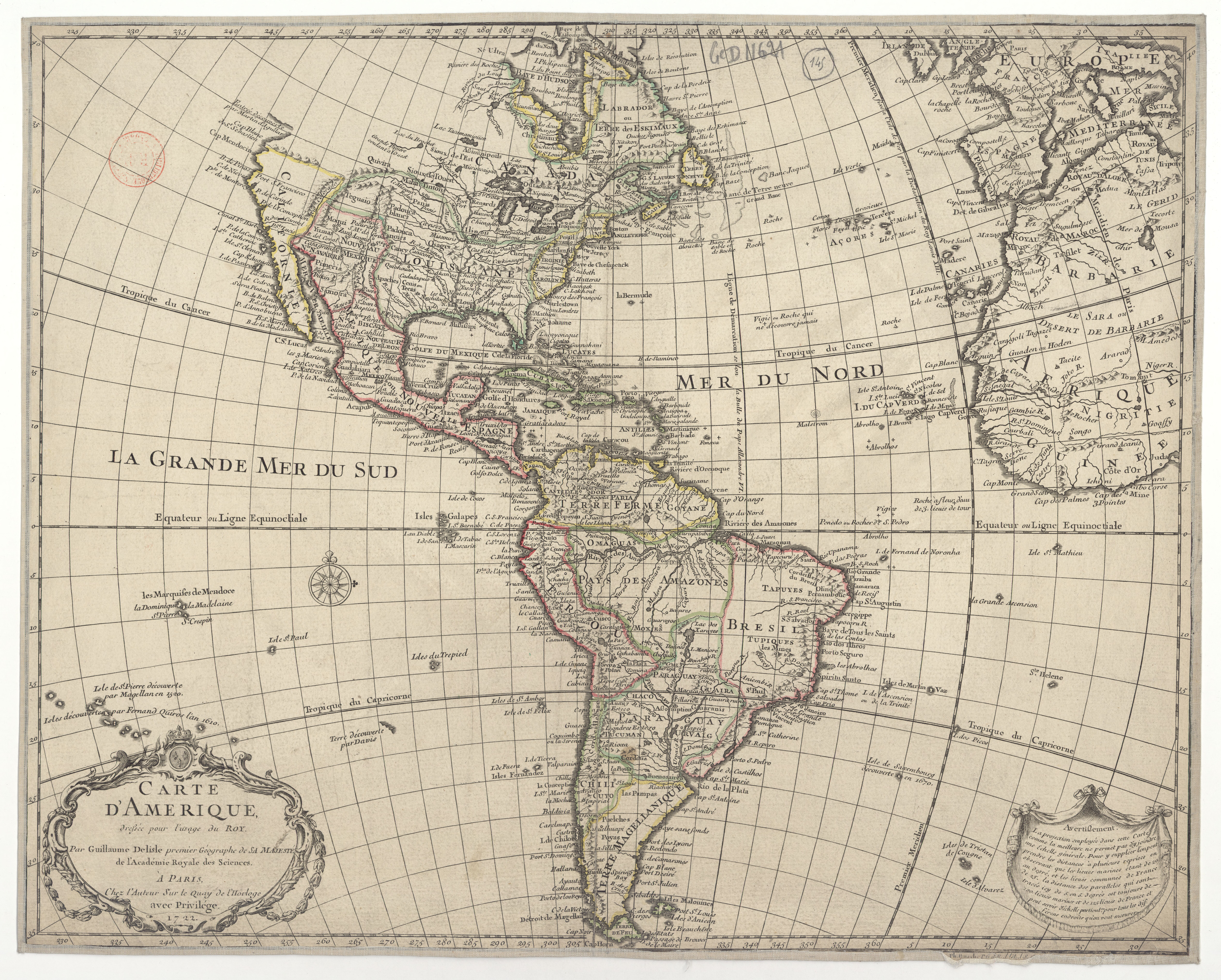
Carte de l'Amerique. 1774. French. Guillaume Delisle

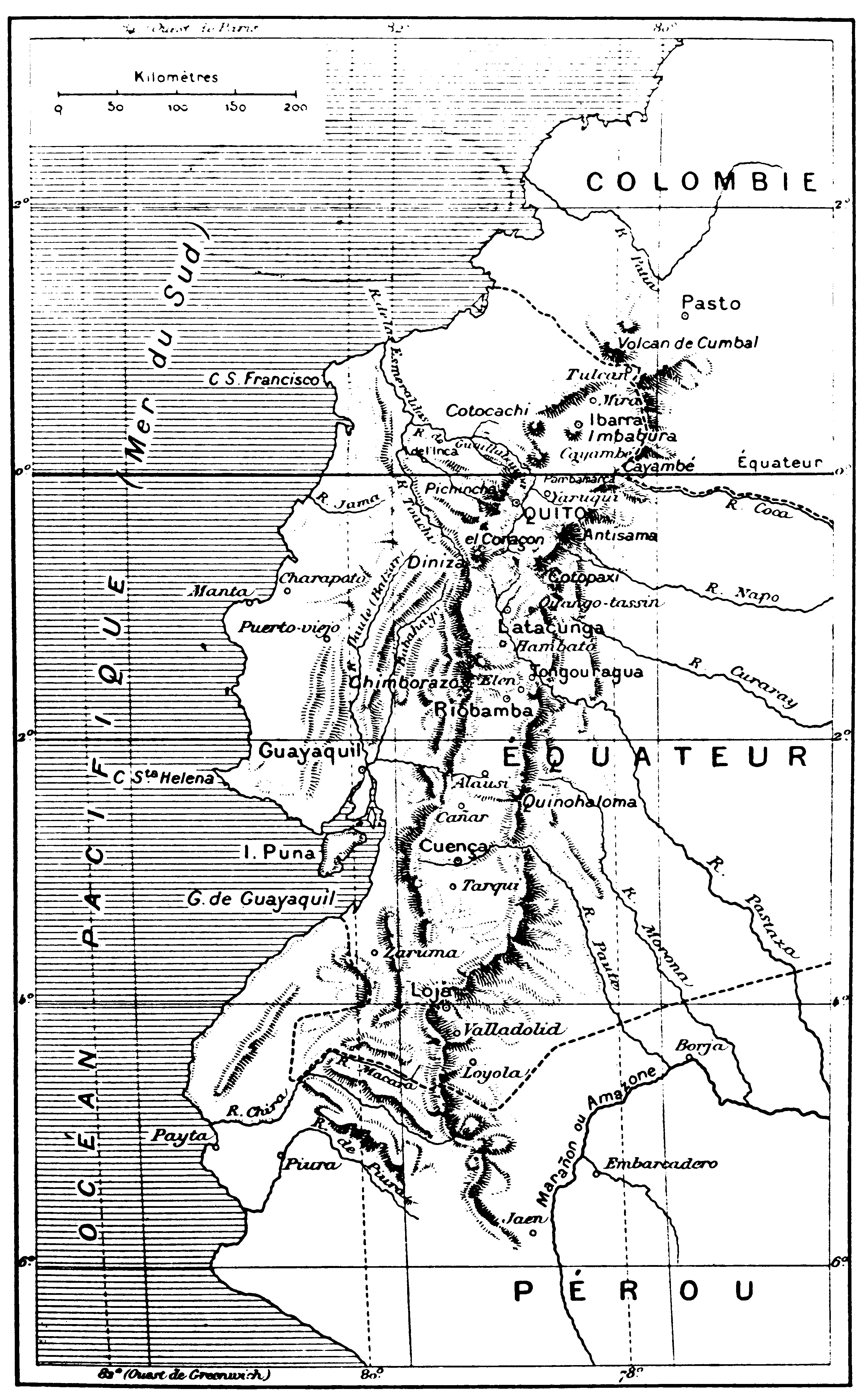
Map of the equator from the La Condamine expedition. mid 18th c.

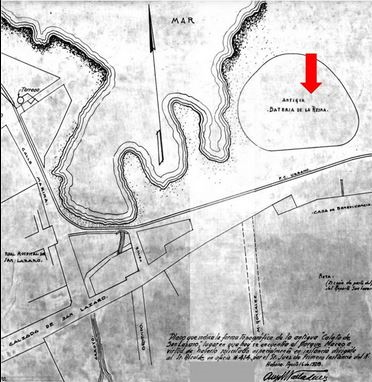
Map of the Caleta de San Lazaro showing the Batería de la Reina, Havana, Cuba

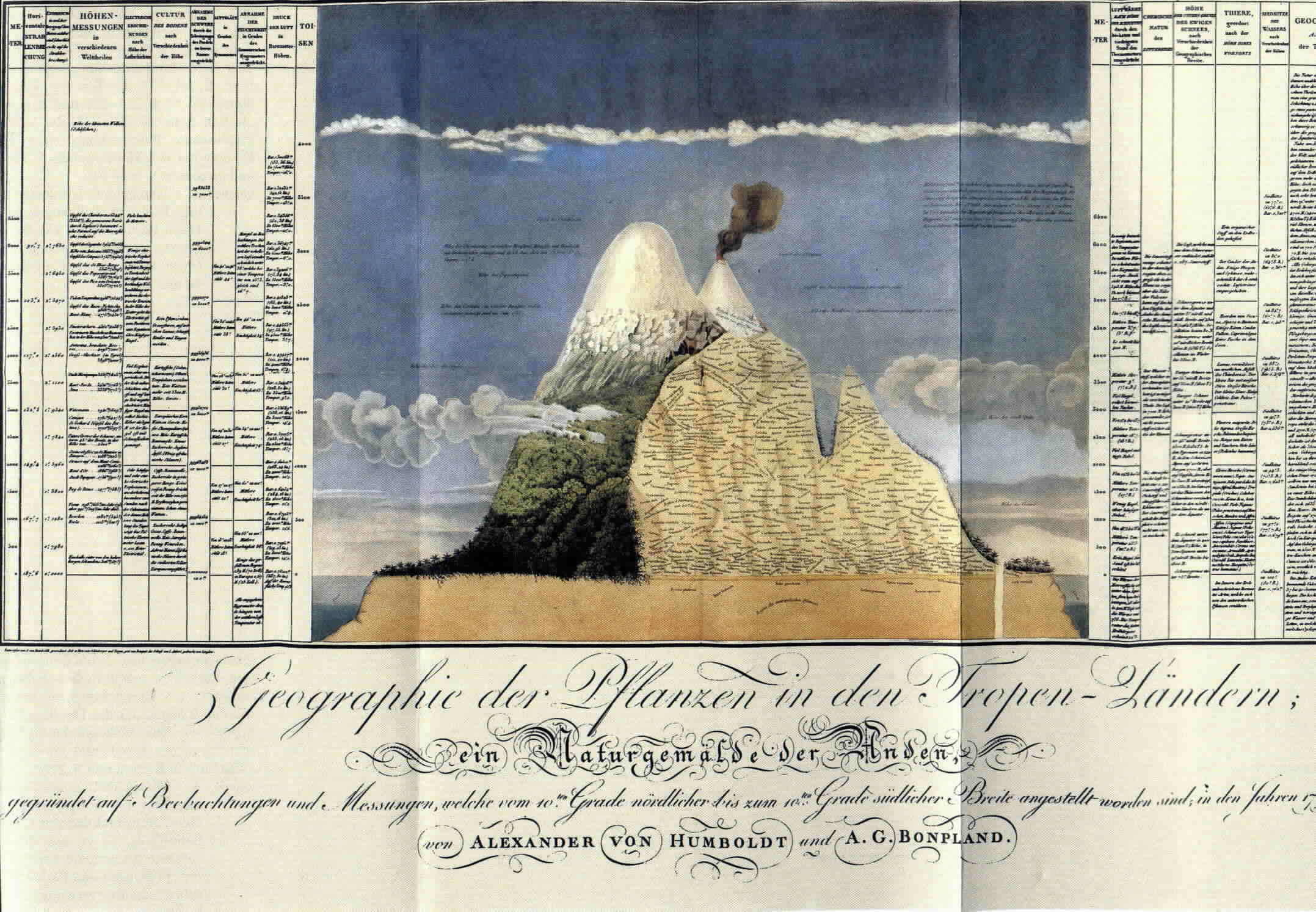
Chimborazo Map, Alexander von Humboldt. 1805.

Spanish and Portuguese empires in 1790, showing lands over which they asserted sovereignty, but did not necessarily control

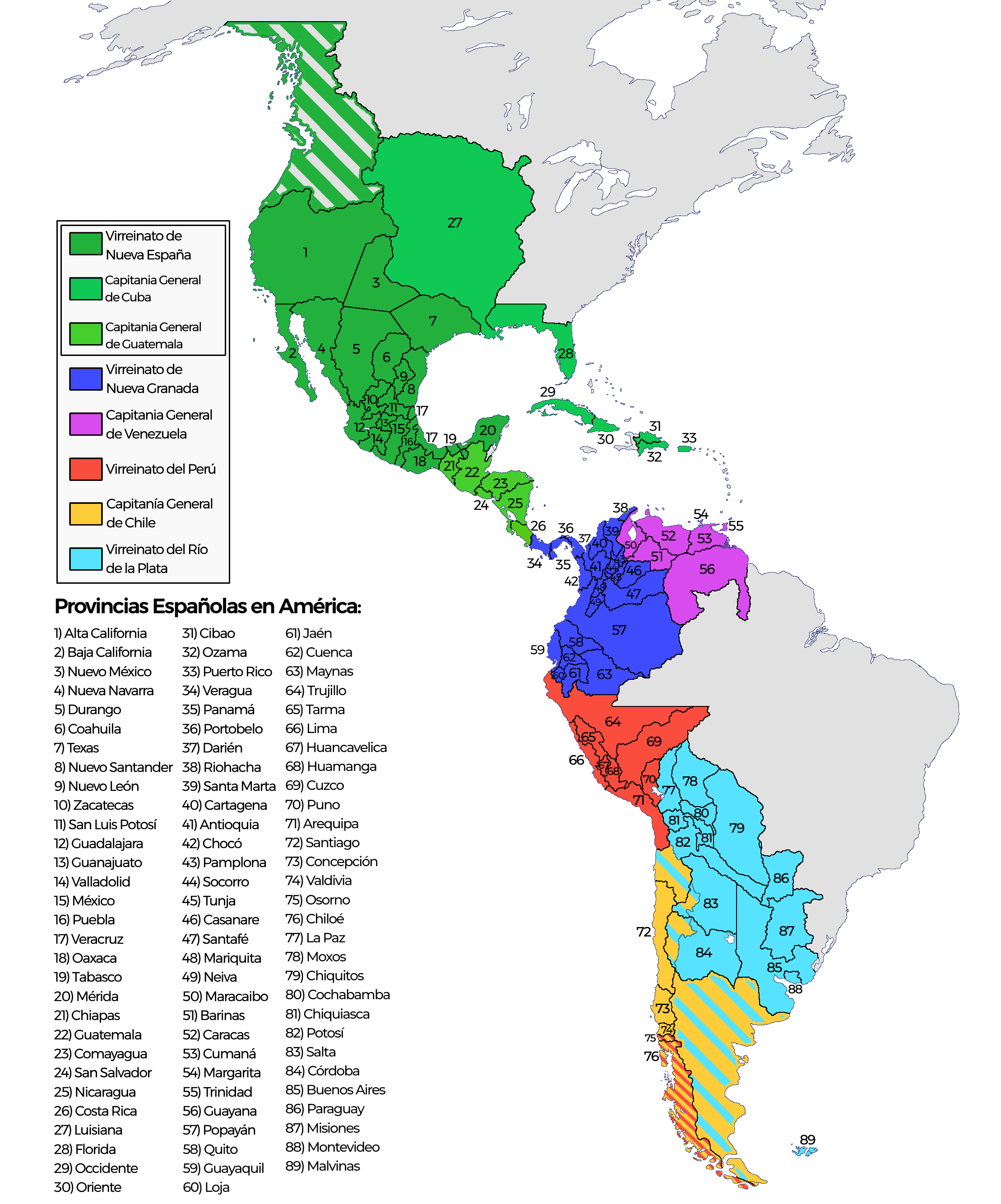
Map of Spanish America, ca. 1800

Captaincy General of Chile in 1775

== See also ==
- History of Cartography
- Oztoticpac Lands Map of Texcoco
- Padrón Real
- Relaciones geográficas
- Waldseemüller map

== Sources ==
- Beyersdorff, Margot. "Covering the Earth: Mapping the Walkabout in Andean Pueblos de Indios" in Latin American Research Review, 42 (2007): 129–160.
- Burnett, D. Graham. "Fabled Land: Walter Raleigh, map of Guiana (El Dorado)." In Mapping Latin America, pp. 38–41.
- Candiani, Vera S. "Bourbons and Water: Joaquín Velázquez de León and Joseph de Gurgaleta, Pérfil y corte por la latitude de las compuertas y puntos principales del canal de Huehuetoca (Mexico), 1795." In Mapping Latin America, pp. 70–73.
- Cline, Howard F. "The Relaciones Geográficas of the Spanish Indies, 1577-1586." Hispanic American Historical Review 44 (1964) 341–374.
- Cline, Howard F. "The Oztoticpac Lands Map of Texcoco, 1540". A La Carte: Selected Papers on Maps and Atlases. Ed. Walter W. Ristow. Washington, D.C.: Library of Congress 1972, 5-33.
- Craib, Raymond B. "Historical Geographies: Antonio García Cubas. Carta General de la República Mexicana 1858" in Mapping Latin America, pp. 153–158.
- Crouch, Dora P. Daniel J. Garr, and Alex I. Mundigo. Spanish City Planning in North America. Cambridge MA: MIT Press 1982.
- Mapping Latin America: A Cartographic Reader. Dym, Jordana and Karl Offen, eds. Chicago: University of Chicago Press 2011. ISBN 978-0-226-61822-7
- Ferreira Furtado, Junia. "The Indies of Knowledge: of, The Imaginary Geography of the Discoveries of Gold in Brazil" in Science in the Spanish and Portuguese Empires, 1500-1800. Daniela Bleichmar, Paula DeVos, Kristin Huffine, and Kevin Sheehan. Stanford: Stanford University Press 2008.
- Harley, J. Brian. "Maps, Knowledge, and Power." In The New Nature of Maps: Essays in the History of Cartography, edited by Paul Laxton, 51–82. Baltimore: Johns Hopkins University Press 2001.
- Harvey, Eleanor Jones. "Mapping A National Identity", Chapter 2, Alexander von Humboldt and the United States. Washington, DC: Smithsonian Institution 2020, pp. 85–134.
- Hébert, John. "America: Martin Waldseemüller, Universalis cosmographia 1507." In Mapping Latin America, pp. 29–32.
- Ireland, Gordon. Boundaries, Possessions, and Conflicts in Central and North America and the Caribbean. reprint. New York: Octagon Books 1971.
- Kagan, Richard. "Projecting Order: Plano fundacional de San Juan de la Frontera (Argentina)." In Mapping Latin America, pp. 46–50.
- Kagan, Richard. Urban Images of the Hispanic World, 1493-1793. New Haven: Yale University Press 2000.
- Klinghoffer, Arthur Jay. The Power of Projections: How Maps Reflect Global Politics and History. Westport CT: Praeger 2006.
- Knapp, Kit S. The Printed Maps of Central America up to 1860. London: London Map Collectors Circle, 1974.
- Mangani, Giorgio. "Abraham Ortelius and the Hermetic Meaning of the Cordiform Projection," Imago Mundi 50 (1998): 59–82.
- Monmonier, Mark. "Maps for Political Propaganda." In How to Lie with Maps, 87–112. Chicago: University of Chicago Press 1991.
- Mundy, Barbara E. "Indigenous Civilization: Map of Tenochtitlan (Mexico) 1524." In Mapping Latin America, pp. 42–45.
- Mundy, Barbara E. "Hybrid Space: Map from the Relación Geográfica of Cholula (Mexico)." In Mapping Latin America, pp. 51–55.
- Mundy, Barbara E. The Mapping of New Spain: Indigenous Cartography and the Maps of the Relaciones Geográficas. Chicago: University of Chicago Press 1996.
- Nebenzahl, Kenneth. Atlas of Columbus and the Great Discoveries. Chicago: Rand McNally 1990.
- Padrón, Ricardo. The Spacious Word: Cartography, Literature, and Empire in Early Modern Spain. Chicago: University of Chicago Press 2004.
- Padrón, Ricardo. "Charting Shores: Diogo Ribeiro, Carta Universal 1529." In Mapping Latin America, pp. 33–37.
- Padrón, Ricardo. "Allegory and Empire: Vicente de Memije, Aspecto Simbólico del Mundo Hispánico, 1761 and Vicente de Memije, Aspecto Geográphico del Mundo Hispánico. 1761." In Mapping Latin America, pp. 84–85.
- Reinhartz, Dennis. The Cartographer and the Literati: Herman Moll and his Intellectual Circle. Lewiston NY: Edwin Mellen Press 1997.
- Restall, Matthew. "Imperial Rivalries: Herman Moll, A Map of the West Indies…explaining what belongs to Spain, England, and France, etc., 1775." In Mapping Latin America, pp. 79–83.
- Safier, Neil. Measuring the New World: Enlightenment Science and South America. Chicago: University of Chicago Press 2008.
- Schwartz, Seymour I. Putting “America” on the Map. Amherst, MA: Prometheus Books 2007.
- Wolff, Hans, ed. America: Early Maps of the New World. Munich: Prestel 1992. ISBN 3-7913-1232-4
- Zimmerer, Karl S. "Mapping Mountains" in Mapping Latin America, pp. 125–130.
