= Pilot Major of Spain =

16th-century Spanish government position

The Pilot Major (Spanish: Piloto Mayor) or Pilot-Major of Spain was an important official of the Casa de Contratación, a crown agency of the Spanish Empire, with specific responsibilities in mapmaking and the licensing of nautical pilots.

On 6 August 1508, the Spanish government ordered the establishment of the Padrón Real as a template for the official map used by every Spanish ship in the 16th century to avoid confusion from a multitude of sailing charts. A commission consisting of the best pilots in the kingdom was constituted, with Amerigo Vespucci as its president and first Pilot Major of Spain, the latter an office created for Vespucci. Pilots returning to Spain were required to report new geographical information to the Pilot Major, who, in twice-monthly consultations with his majesty's cartographers, would decide whether to include it in the Padrón Real, later called the Padrón General. The Pilot Major was eventually given permission to sell copies of the map for his own benefit.

The Pilot Major was also responsible for "examining and licensing all pilots of the Spanish fleet."

Holders of the office include:

- Amerigo Vespucci (1454–1512), Italian explorer
- Juan Díaz de Solís (c. 1470–1516), Portuguese or Spanish navigator and explorer, appointed in 1512 following the death of Vespucci
- Sebastian Cabot (c. 1474–c. 1557), Venetian explorer, Pilot Major of Spain from 5 February 1518 to 25 October 1525, succeeding Díaz de Solís, and again from 1533 to 1547

In 1519, a new position was created, Cartographer (Cartógrafo), to assume some of the responsibilities of the Pilot Major.
