= Padrón Real =

16th-century Spanish government world map

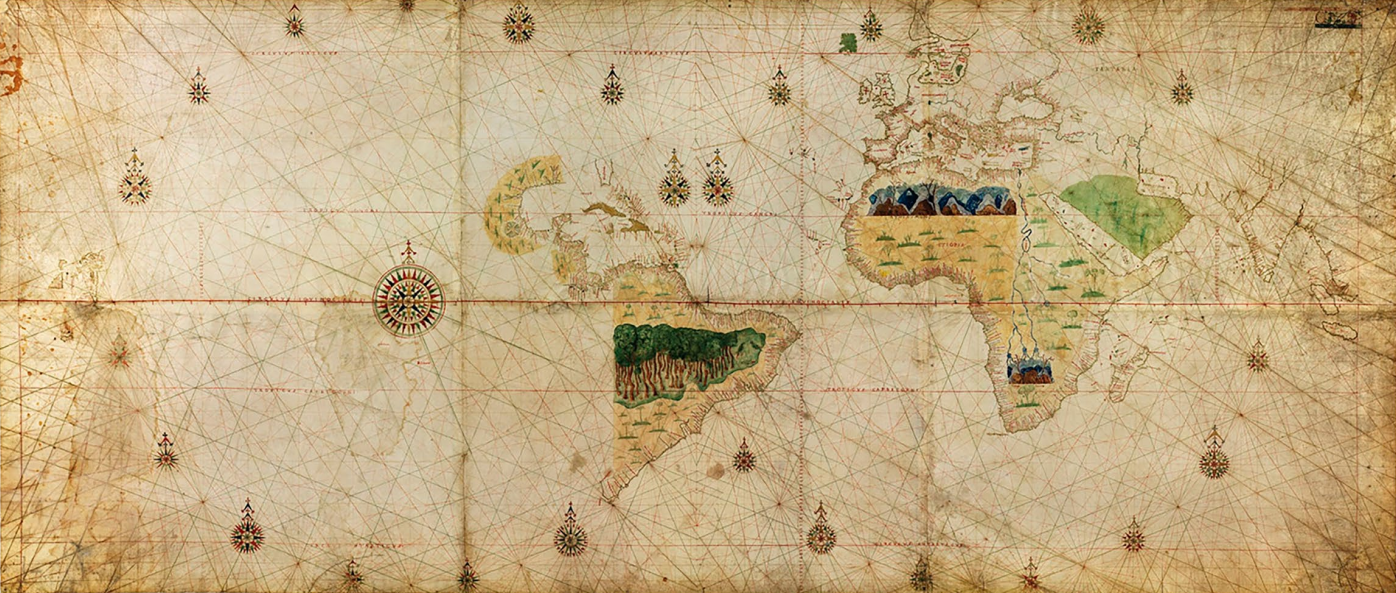
The Geocarta Nautica Universale (1523), the first known map to show the discoveries of the Magellan Expedition and the full extent of the Pacific Ocean, believed to have been a copy of the Spanish standard map drafted by Giovanni Vespucci's assistants and possessed now by the Royal Library of Turin.

The Padrón Real (Spanish pronunciation: [paˈðɾon reˈal], Royal Register), known after 2 August 1527 as the Padrón General (Spanish: [paˈðɾoŋ xeneˈɾal], General Register), was the official and secret Spanish master map used as a template for the maps present on all Spanish ships during the 16th century. It was kept in Seville, Spain by the Casa de Contratación. Ship pilots were required to use a copy of the official government chart, or risk the penalty of a 50 doblas fine. The map probably included a large-scale chart that hung on the wall of the old Alcázar of Seville. Well-known official cartographers and pilots who contributed to and used the map included Amerigo Vespucci, Diogo Ribeiro, Sebastian Cabot, Alonzo de Santa Cruz, and Juan Lopez de Velasco.

== Origins ==
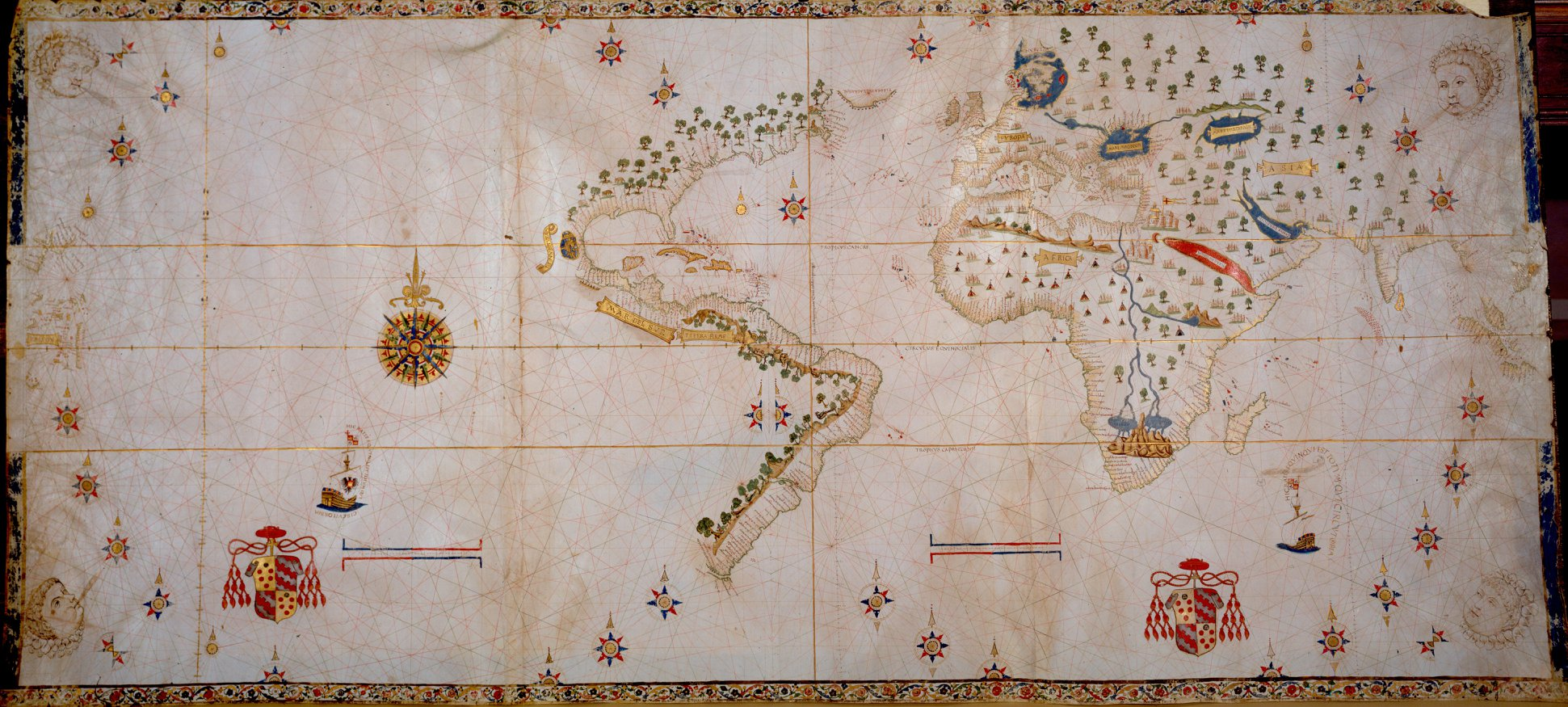
The Salviati Planisphere (c. 1525), marking the Tordesillas Line and its supposed antimeridian. Made by Nuño García de Toreno, it was given by Charles V to the cardinal Giovanni Salviati, who officiated his wedding to Isabella of Portugal at Seville in 1526.

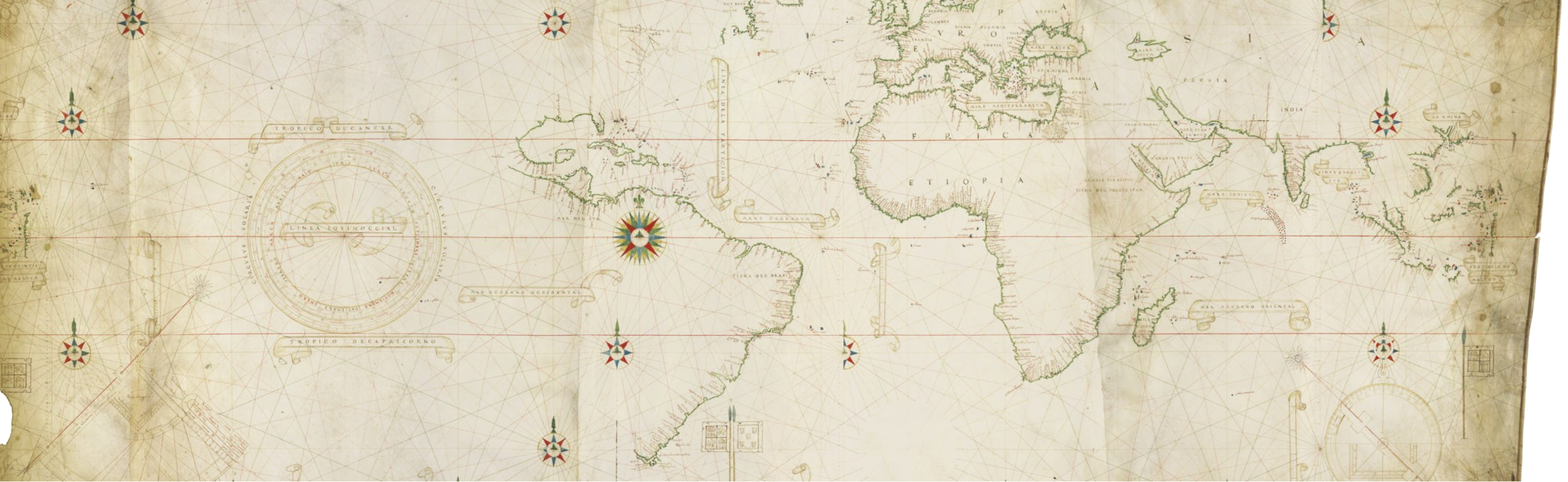
The Castiglione world map (c. 1525).

Facsimile of Diogo Ribeiro's 1527 Carta Universal. The original is in the Herzogin Anna Amalia Bibliothek in Weimar, Germany.

Griggs's facsimile of Diogo Ribeiro's 1529 Carta Universal, known as the Propaganda Map or Second Borgia Map. The original is in the Vatican Library.

The Padrón Real was constantly improved from its first version in 1507/08. It was produced by the Seville-based Spanish organization, the Casa de Contratación, established in 1503. All returning ships had to report any details of new lands or discoveries they had made to the Casa de Contratación, together with latitudes and longitudes. The ship's officers were sworn by oath before they testified. The pilots at the Casa de Contratación then plotted this information on their maps. When a new ship was setting out, they would then be given charts which were copied from the master map, the Padron Real.

Diego Ribeiro, who began service with Spanish in 1518, prepared several versions of the chart, during 1525 to 1532, after Juan Sebastian Elcano's circumnavigation of the globe or after Spanish explorations in North America. Other revisions to the royal chart were directed by royal chartmakers Alonso de Chaves during 1536 and by Alonzo de Santa Cruz in 1542.

Almost none of these maps have survived, but there were occasionally copies made for foreign princes and dignitaries, and some of them still exist. For example, in the Biblioteca Medicea-Laurenziana in Florence, there is a map believed to be copied from the Padrón Real known as the "Salviati Planisphere". This planisphere map was probably given by the Holy Roman Emperor Charles V to Cardinal Giovanni Salviati, the papal nuncio, in 1526. In the archive of the Marchesi Castiglione in Mantua, there is another similar world map, produced about the same time and given by the Emperor to Count Baldassare Castiglione.

There are a few other examples of these world maps copied from the Padrón Real that were given to various German princes. The most impressive copy of the Padrón Real is in the Vatican Library, and was given to the Pope by Charles V of Spain in 1529. The large map (83.8 cm x 203.2 cm.) is on vellum, and thought to be one of the presentation copies made in the 1520s when Spain and Portugal had a boundary dispute. The chart has a number of rhumb lines and compass roses found in medieval portolan navigation charts of the Mediterranean Sea. The coastlines have many toponyms identifying particular places as well as some claiming them for Spain. Ribeiro's map also has rudimentary latitude lines, a line marking the equator, the Tropic of Cancer and Capricorn, as well as the Arctic and Antarctic circles all of which were relatively new for the era. It does not have any imagined information where none was available.

The Padrón Real was similar in principle to the Portuguese secret master map, the Padrão Real, developed by the Portuguese organization Casa da Índia, or House of Índia, which had been established in Lisbon in 1500 (or 1501 according to some sources), and lasted until 1755.

== Mapmakers ==
This enterprise was a huge project, and it was taken very seriously. Without good navigational aids, the ability of Spain to exploit and profit from its discoveries would have been more limited. The Casa de Contratación had a large number of cartographers and navigators (pilots), archivists, record keepers, administrators and others involved in producing and managing the Padrón Real.

The famous Amerigo Vespucci, who made at least two voyages to the New World, was a pilot working at the Casa de Contratación until his death in 1512. A special position was created for Vespucci, the "pilot major" (chief of navigation) in 1508. He had the responsibility of training new pilots for ocean voyages. His nephew Juan Vespucci inherited his famous uncle's maps, charts, and nautical instruments, and was appointed to Amerigo's former position as official Spanish government pilot at Seville. In 1524, Juan Vespucci was appointed Examiner of Pilots, replacing Sebastian Cabot who was then commanding an expedition in Brazil.

During the 1530s and 1540s, the principal mapmakers (known as "cosmographers") in the Casa de Contratación working on the Padrón General included Alonso de Santa Cruz, Sebastian Cabot, and Pedro de Medina.

Mapmaker Diego Gutiérrez was named cosmographer in the Casa de la Contratación by royal appointment on October 22, 1554, after the death of his father Diego in January 1554, and worked on the Padrón General. In 1562, Diego Gutiérrez published a remarkable map entitled "Americae ... Descriptio" in Antwerp. The reason it was published in Antwerp instead of Spain was that the Spanish engravers did not have the necessary skill to print such a complicated document. Other cosmographers included Alonso de Chaves, Francisco Falero, Jerónimo de Chaves, Sancho Gutiérrez (Diego's brother).

During the late 16th century, Juan Lopez de Velasco was cosmographer major in Seville. He produced a master map and twelve subsidiary maps portraying the worldwide Spanish Empire in cartographic form. This feat surpassed anything done by other European powers at that time and marked the high point of the cartographic revolution carried out by the cosmographers of the Kingdom of Spain, which would spread throughout Europe

== See also ==
- Cartography
- Cartography of Latin America

== Notes ==
[r] - An exhibit of Padron Real was March 2002, as "Florida, the Making of a State".
[s] - The main sources include:
