= Casa de Contratación =

Crown agency for the Spanish Empire

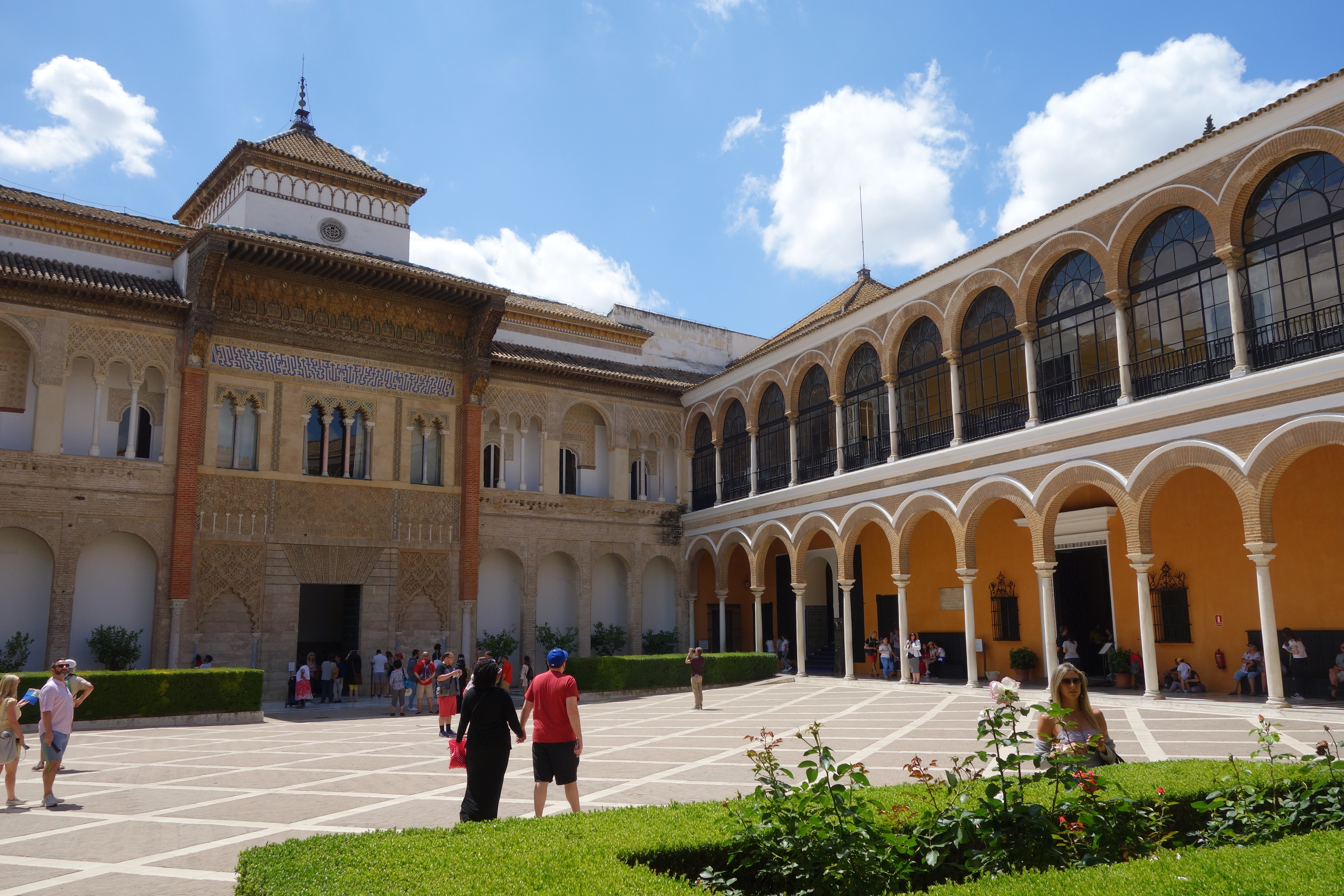
The Patio de la Montería in the Alcázar of Seville. The two-story building on the right, initially the Cuarto del Almirante (building for the Admiral of Castile), was the location of the Casa de la Contratación from 1503 to 1717.

The Casa de Contratación (Spanish pronunciation: [ˈkasa ðe kontɾataˈθjon], House of Trade) or Casa de la Contratación de las Indias ("House of Trade of the Indies") was established by the Crown of Castile, in 1503 in the port of Seville (and transferred to Cádiz in 1717) as a crown agency for the Spanish Empire. It functioned until 1790, when it was abolished in a government reorganization.

Before the establishment of the Council of the Indies in 1524, the Casa de Contratación had broad powers over overseas matters, especially financial matters concerning trade and legal disputes arising from it. It also was responsible for the licensing of emigrants, training of pilots, creation of maps and charters, and probate of estates of Spaniards dying overseas. Its official name was La Casa y Audiencia de Indias.

== Establishment ==
Unlike the later East India Companies, which were chartered companies established by the Dutch, English, and others, the Casa collected all colonial taxes and duties, approved all voyages of exploration and trade, maintained secret information on trade routes and new discoveries, licensed captains, and administered commercial law.

In theory, no Spaniard could sail anywhere without the approval of the Casa. However, smuggling often took place in different parts of the Spanish Empire.

The Casa de Contratación was created by Queen Isabella I of Castile in 1503, eleven years after Christopher Columbus's landfall in the Americas in 1492. Ochoa Alvarez de Isasaga (Ysasaga) was named factor for the Crown by King Ferdinand "the Catholic" and Queen Juana I of Castile in 1509 for the Casa.

The Casa was the Spanish counterpart of the Portuguese organization, the Casa da India, or House of Índia of Lisbon, established in 1434 and destroyed by the 1755 Lisbon earthquake.

Dr. Sancho de Matienzo became the first treasurer, Jimeno de Bribiesca the first contador, and Francisco Pinelo the first factor. They soon controlled the economic development of Hispaniola.

== Operation ==
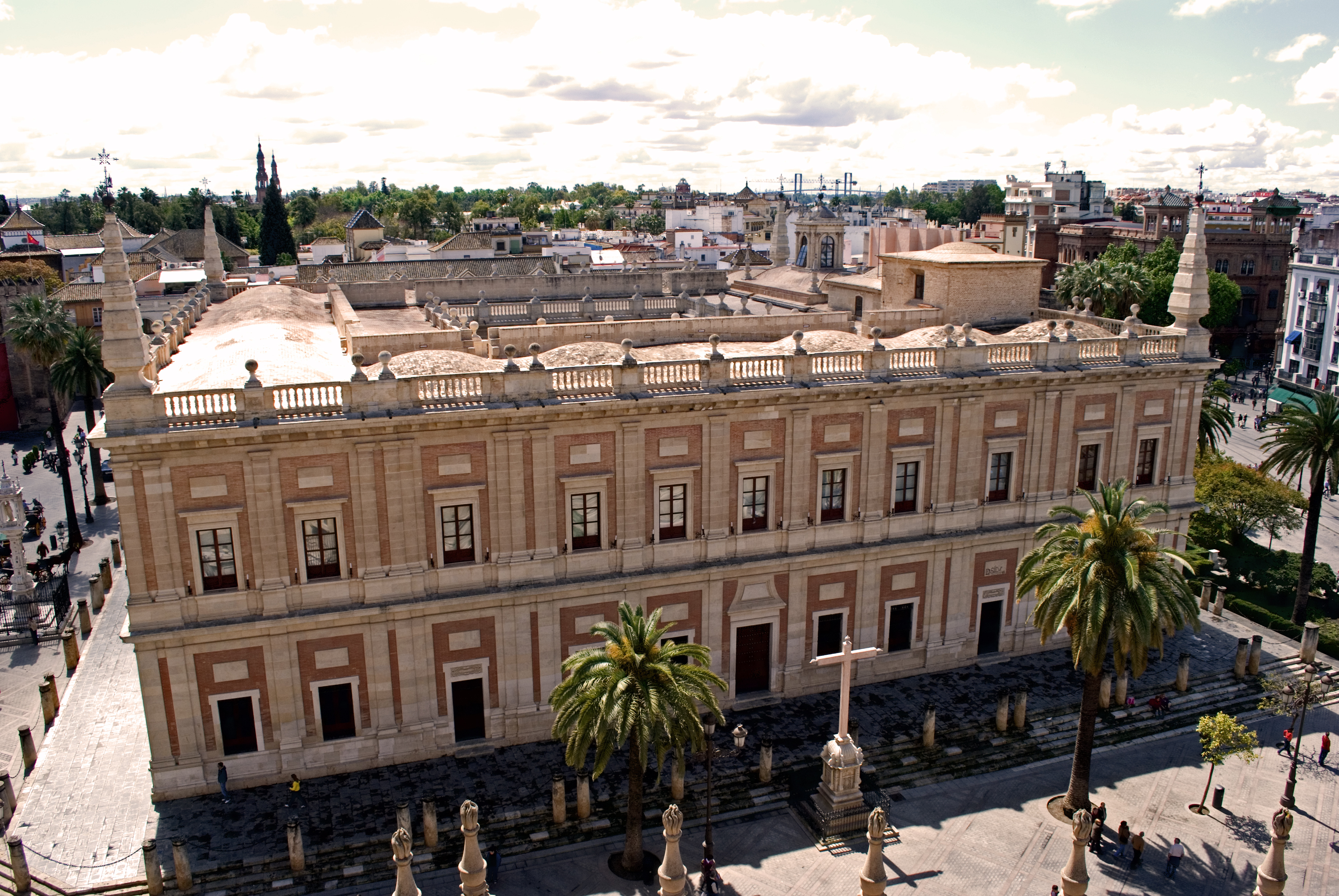
The building of the Consulado de Cargadores a Indias (the Consulate of the Indian Traders), today the General Archive of the Indies, which houses the archive of the Casa.

A 20 per cent tax, the quinto real (royal fifth) was levied by the Casa on all precious metals entering Spain.

The other taxes could run as high as 40% to provide naval protection for the trading ships or as low as 10 per cent during financial turmoil to encourage investment and economic growth in the colony. Each ship was required to employ a clerk to keep detailed logs of all goods carried and all transactions.

The Casa de Contratación produced and managed the Padrón Real, the official and secret Spanish map used as a template for the maps carried by every Spanish ship during the 16th century.

It was constantly improved from its first version in 1508, and was the counterpart of the Portuguese map, the Padrão Real. The Casa also ran a navigation school; new pilots, or navigators, were trained for ocean voyages here.

Spain employed the then standard mercantilist model, governed (at least in theory) by the Casa in Seville. Trade with the overseas possessions was handled by a merchants' guild based in Seville, the Consulado de mercaderes, which worked in conjunction with the Casa de Contratación. Trade was physically controlled in well-regulated trade fleets, the famous Flota de Indias and the Manila galleons.

== Reductions ==
By the late 17th century, the Casa de Contratación had fallen into bureaucratic gridlock, and the empire as a whole was failing, due primarily to Spain's inability to finance both war on the Continent and a global empire.

More often than not, the riches transported from Manila and Acapulco to Spain were officially signed over to Spain's creditors before the Manila galleon made port.

In the 18th century, the new Bourbon kings reduced the power of Seville and the Casa de Contratacion. In 1717 they moved the Casa from Seville to Cádiz, diminishing Seville's importance in international trade. Charles III further limited the powers of the Casa, and his son, Charles IV, abolished it altogether in 1790.

The Spanish treasure fleets were also officially ended due to the abolition, bringing an end to the prosperous Spanish colonial income.

== Mapmakers ==
The cartographic enterprise at the Casa de Contratación was a huge undertaking, and critical to the success of the voyages of discovery. Without good navigational aids, the ability of Spain to exploit and profit from what it found would have been limited. The Casa had a large number of cartographers and navigators (pilots), archivists, record keepers, administrators and others involved in producing and managing the Padrón Real.

Explorer Amerigo Vespucci, who made at least two voyages to the New World, was a pilot working at the Casa de Contratación until his death in 1512. A special position was created for Vespucci, the piloto mayor (chief of navigation), in 1508; he trained new pilots for ocean voyages.

His nephew, Juan Vespucci, inherited his famous uncle's maps, charts, and nautical instruments, and along with Andrés de San Martín was appointed to Amerigo's former position as the official Spanish government pilot at Seville.

In 1524, Juan Vespucci was appointed examinador de pilotos (Examiner of Pilots), replacing Sebastian Cabot who was then leading an expedition in Brazil.

In the 1530s and 1540s, the principal mapmakers (known as "cosmographers") in the Casa de Contratación working on the Padrón Real included Alonso de Santa Cruz, Sebastian Cabot, and Pedro de Medina. The mapmaker Diego Gutiérrez was appointed as cosmographer in the Casa on October 22, 1554, after the death of his father Diego in January 1554; he also worked on the Padrón Real.

In 1562, Gutierrez published the map entitled "Americae ... Descriptio" in Antwerp. It was published in Antwerp instead of Spain because the Spanish engravers did not have the necessary skill to print such a complicated document. Other cosmographers included Alonso de Chaves, Jerónimo de Chaves, and Sancho Gutiérrez (Diego's brother).

In the late 16th century, Juan López de Velasco was the first Cosmógrafo-Cronista Mayor (Cosmographer-Chronicler Major) of the Council of the Indies in Seville.

He produced a master map and twelve subsidiary maps portraying the worldwide Spanish empire in cartographic form.

Although these maps are not especially accurate or detailed, his work represented the apogee of Spanish mapmaking in that period, and surpassed anything done by the other European powers.

Cartographers in England, the Low Countries, and Germany, however, continued to improve their skills in making maps and in organizing and presenting geographic information, until by the end of the 17th century, even Spanish intellectuals were lamenting that the maps produced by foreigners were superior to those made in Spain.

== See also ==
- The Virgin of the Navigators, the first painting depicting the discovery of the Americas, is in a Casa de Contratación chapel.
- Llotja
- Merchant guild
