= Juan Sebastián Elcano =

Spanish explorer (c. 1486 – 1526)

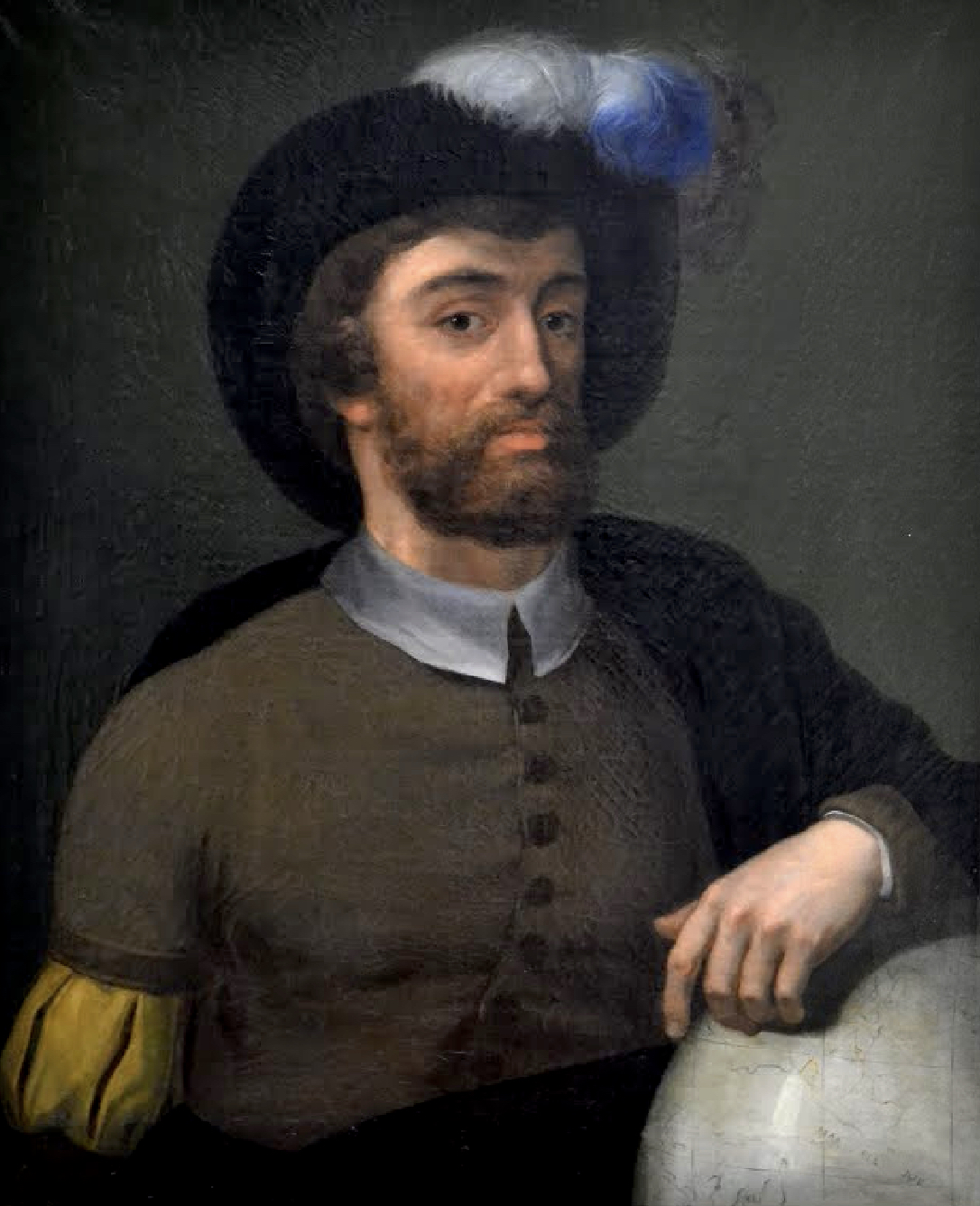
- 19th-century anonymous portrait
- Born: Juan Sebastián Elcano c. 1486; Getaria, Gipuzkoa, Castile (in modern-day Spain)
- Died: August 4, 1526 (aged 39–40); Pacific Ocean
- Occupations: Explorer; navigator; mariner
- Known for: First circumnavigation of the Earth
- Partner: María Hernández Dernialde
- Children: N. Elcano (daughter) and Domingo Elcano (son).
- Parent(s): Domingo Sebastián Elcano I, and Catalina del Puerto

Juan Sebastián Elcano (Elkano in modern Basque; also known as del Cano; 1486/1487 – 4 August 1526) was a Spanish navigator, ship-owner and explorer (Note: Elcano was Basque, as was noted also by other members of the expedition. Martín de Ayamonte, in his relation to the Portuguese inquity, clearly said that the captain was Biscayne. Modern sources also state this.) best known for having completed the first circumnavigation of the Earth in the ship Victoria on the Magellan expedition to the Spice Islands.

The expedition had orders to return through the Pacific Ocean, remaining in the Spanish hemisphere. Elcano's decision to continue westward across the Indian Ocean led to the circumnavigation. He received recognition for his achievement by Charles V of Spain with a coat of arms bearing a globe and the Latin motto Primus circumdedisti me (You were the first to circumnavigate me).

Despite his achievements, information on Elcano is scarce and he is the subject of great historiographical controversy, because of the scarcity of original sources on his private life and personality. Even in Spain, his first biographies were written in the second half of the 19th century, after three centuries of neglect.

Following his success, the king entrusted him with another large expedition to the Spice Islands, headed by the nobleman García Jofre de Loaisa, which was not completed. Elcano died of scurvy in the Pacific Ocean during this venture.

== Name ==
Elcano's name has been written in different ways by historians. His signature seems to read Delcano, or possibly Del Cano, although it is difficult to be sure: Enrique Santamaría shows that his lack of dexterity when signing his name leads him to leave gaps between the letters, so sometimes he signed "del ca no". In Spanish historiography it most commonly has been interpreted as "Del Cano" (or de Cano), but also as simply "Cano".

In the Basque language the form "Elkano" is used. Mitxelena, in his book Apellidos vascos, interprets the surname Elkano from Basque. Between the suffixes -ano and -no, he provides arguments for the latter, the diminutive suffix. He proposes that the first part of the surname is elge. Mitxelena reconstructs the previous form of this elge, and argues that the surname Elkano developed from the association of these two morphemes and that it is also a toponym. It exists in different areas of the Basque Country as a minor place name, but also as the name of a village in Navarre.

== Family ==
Juan Sebastián Elcano's mother was Catalina del Puerto or Catalina Portu, and his father was Domingo Sebastián Elcano. The Portu or Puerto were a powerful family of clergy and scribes. Elcano's grandmother, Catalina's mother, was Domenja Olazabal. Formerly it was believed that she belonged to a noble family of the Tolosa area. It is known that Catalina, who was alive at the time of Elcano's death, asked the king upon her arrival in Getaria 10 years later for the pension that had been promised to Elcano, legally due her according to his will.

Domingo Sebastián Elcano and Catalina Portu had eight children, their first son being born in 1481, and Juan Sebastián being the fourth born son. Next came Domingo Elcano, who was given the name of his father and became a priest in Getaria. The four other sons in the family were Martín Pérez, Antón Martín, Juan Martín, and Ochoa Martín. Martín Pérez, Antón Martín and Ochoa Martín were also mariners, and sailed with Juan Sebastián Elcano in the second expedition to the Moluccas. The daughters, i.e., Juan Sebastián's sisters, were Sebastiana de Elcano and Inés de Elcano. Apparently Elcano also had a half-sister, María, Domingo's illegitimate daughter.

Elcano had two children: a son, Domingo Elcano, with María Hernández de Hernialde in Getaria, and a daughter, María, with a woman called María Bidaurreta in Valladolid. In his will, he bequeathed 100 ducats to his son's mother, María Hernández de Hernialde. To his daughter he left 40 ducats, conditional on her coming to live in Getaria before she was 4 years old.

=== Family social position and economic status ===
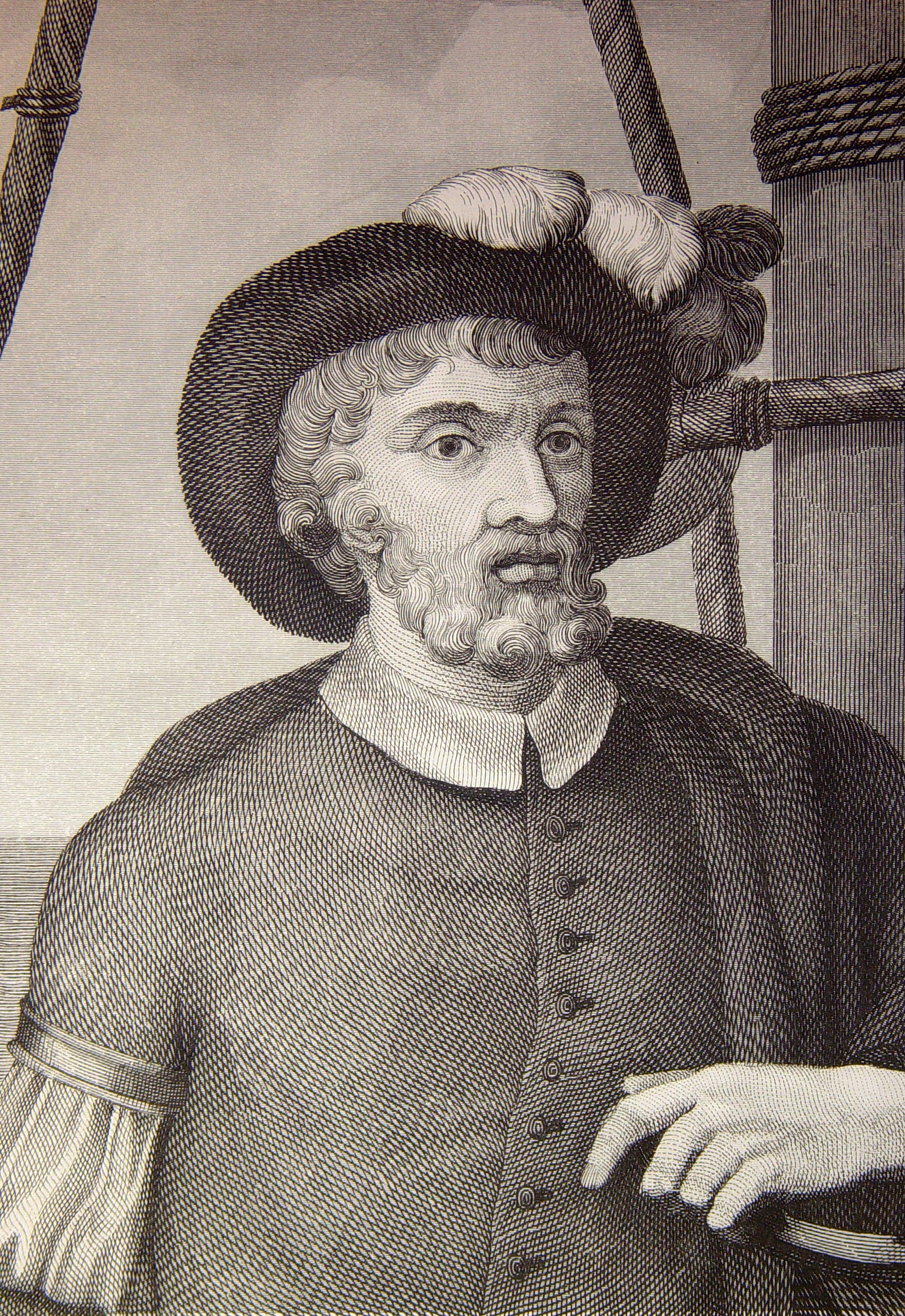
Modern engraving of Elcano, c. 1854

Some historians have said that the Elcanos were a family of maritime transporters who operated in the Mediterranean. Their ownership of a vessel is suggested by the amount of taxes the family paid the Crown in 1500.

Some 19th century sources say that the Elcano family belonged to the nobility, but this is questionable. Elcano asked the king for the right to bear arms, a privilege of the nobles, and for his brothers to accompany him on his next expedition, indicating that the Elcano brothers, on their father's side at least, were neither nobles nor hidalgos, and that the Portus, on their mother's side, were probably not nobles either. However, the Olazabal family on his grandmother's side may have been hidalgos, but since nobility was not inherited in the matrilineal line, the Portus, through Catalina the daughter of Domenja, would not be hidalgos nor would be the Elcanos, the grandchildren of Domenja.

Fernandez de Navarrete states that, in addition to being a fisherman and a mariner, Elcano acted as a smuggler on board a French ship, but no original sources are given to confirm this. Some biographies point out that the Elcano family experienced economic hardship because Elcano's father died young and his mother had to support eight siblings, but this assertion is unfounded.

As attested in documentation, in 1500, when Elcano was about 14 years old, a large tax was levied in Getaria, with his father Domingo Elcano appearing in the thirteenth position on the tax rolls, having paid 23½ maravedís. It seems, therefore, that they were quite solvent, since they are named among the richest families of the town. Another indication of his family's wealth is that the royal document later granting him a pardon states that when Elcano was young and acting as a merchant in the Mediterranean, he was the owner of a 200-ton vessel.

Elcano got rich from the circumnavigation voyage, earning 613,250 maravedis. This was an immense fortune, an amount equivalent to the salary of a sea pilot for 20 years, as compared to the 23½ maravedis paid by his father in municipal taxes. Of that fortune, 104,526 maravedis was his shipmaster's and captain's wage, while the rest was earned by selling the cloves imported from the Moluccas.

== Biography ==
=== Birth ===
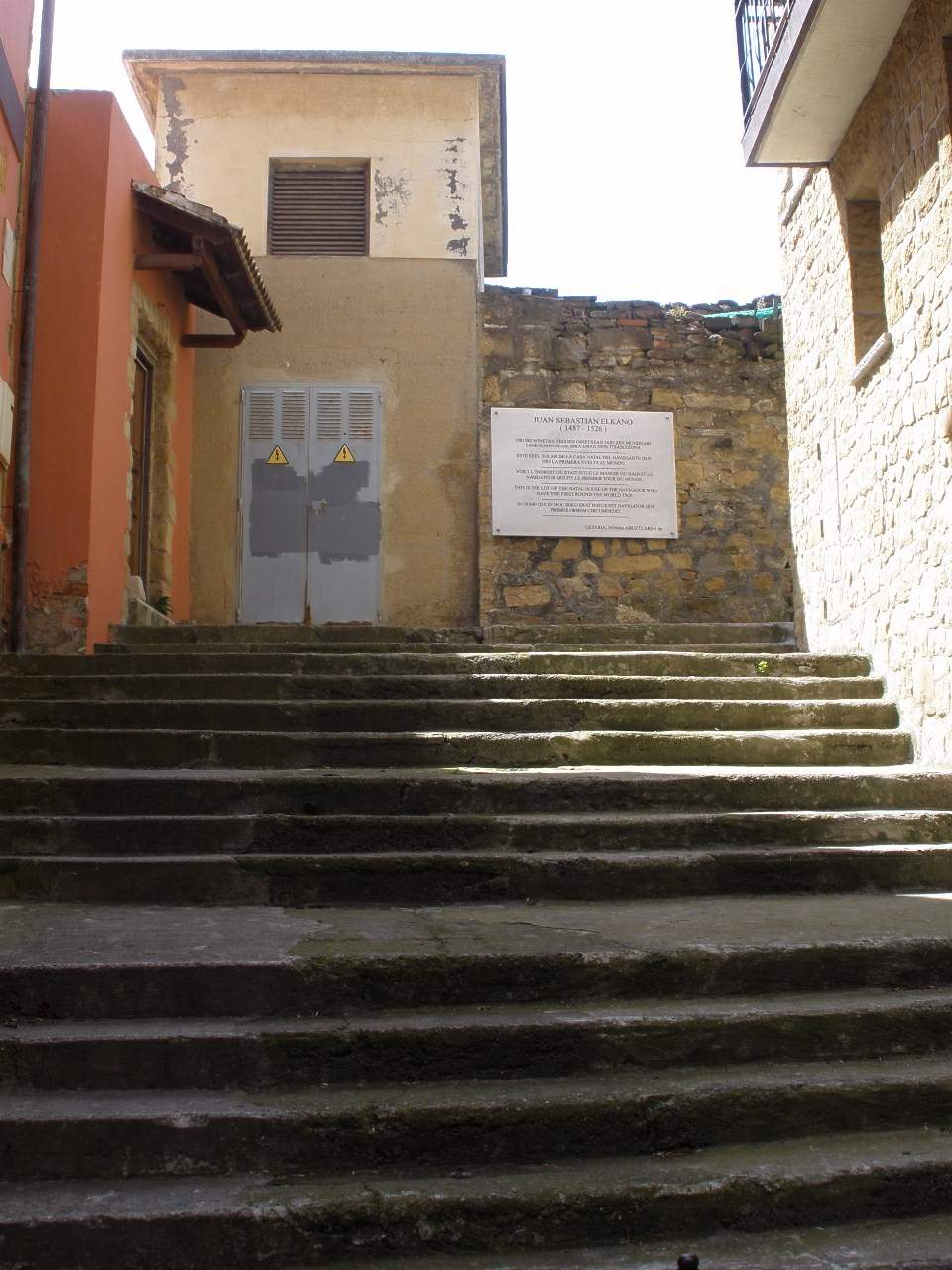
House where Elcano is said to have been born. Although there is presently a plaque there that alleges such, it is unlikely.

The date of Elcano's birth is unknown, but it can be inferred with a fair amount of certainty that his year of birth was 1486 or 1487. Spanish historiographers have written that he was 42 years old when he sailed with Magellan in 1518, which would place his birth year in 1476. However, before setting sail Elcano himself had confirmed that he was "approximately" 32 years old, as recorded in a document of August 1519; therefore, it is reasonable to believe that he was born in 1486 or 1487.

There is little doubt about Elcano's place of birth because in his will, drawn by Elcano himself, he mentions that his birthplace is Getaria. It is usually said that he was born in the house located in San Roque Street in the municipality of Getaria, today called the "Birthplace of Juan Sebastián Elcano". There is a plaque commemorating the event next to the house. Even if he was born there, the house did not belong to the Elcano family, but to his maternal grandfather's family, the Portus.

In the chronicles of the time, Elcano is also presented as a "Getarian". In 1601, the chronicler Juan de Mariana, after writing that Elcano was from Getaria, adds: "from Biscay by nationality or Guipuscoan". At that time the Basques were called 'Vizcaínos' or 'Biscayans'. It has been deduced from indirect information that the Basque language was his mother tongue, but it is unequivocally true that he also communicated in Spanish, as can be seen in the letters he wrote to the king, and in the interrogations he underwent in Seville and in Valladolid. It appears that he could read Latin as well, because the two books referred to in his will were written in that language.

=== Early life ===
Little is known about Elcano's youth. As a young man he owned a large ship and sailed in the Mediterranean. He sold the ship to the Savoyards to resolve legal problems he had incurred because the king had not paid him a salary for 'services rendered' on the kings's orders. It is often repeated, for example, that in 1509 he participated in the conquest of Oran, in the Mediterranean, under the direction of Cardinal Francisco Jiménez de Cisneros, commanding his own his two-hundred-ton ship. However, in the register of ships participating in the conquest of Oran, no captain Elcano, or anything similar, is recorded. According to Spanish historiography, Elcano participated with his ship in the Italian wars under the leadership of Gonzalo Fernandez de Cordova, known as The Great Captain (El Gran Capitán) (1495–1504). This is also doubtful because there are no primary sources to prove it, and, above all because Elcano was then 8 years old (17 according to the Spanish historiography), and it is impossible that an 8-year-old boy was already a ship owner or fought in the war.

The certificate of pardon that the king issued to Elcano has been preserved. It mentions that he acted in the service of the king "in the Levante and Africa", but these actions are not further specified. It also states that since the king had not paid him the promised salaries, he was forced to sell his ship to the House of Savoy. Presumably when he had asked for money from the merchants of Savoy he had to offer them the ship as a guarantee. Therefore, in the case of his participating in a military campaign in the Mediterranean 'in the service of the king', perhaps the events of the catastrophe of Gelves (1510) was a factor, since that military defeat would explain Elcano's debt. Forced to pay for the ship and the crew's wages, but with no war prizes, this could have been the cause of his getting into debt. At the age of twenty-three, unable to pay off his financial obligation and still on board the ship in Italy, he had to hand it over to the Savoyards to satisfy the debt. Another hypothesis is that Elcano performed the 'royal services' in the autumn of 1516, during the battle to take Algiers, also a military defeat, and that he then had to relinquish his ship.

It is known that in the summer of 1515 Elcano joined the local militia. The Royal Corregidor asked 500 Gipuzkoans to go to Hondarribia and San Sebastian to face the threat of the French. Elcano went there, along with 11 compatriots, charging 30 maravedís per day. It would appear that if he had to enroll in the local militia in 1515 and he did not own a ship at the time, his engaging in the battle to take Algiers is unlikely. Being in his twenties during the 1510s, it is unusual that Elcano already owned a ship of 200 tons, and for such a young man to have this responsibility, but it is clear that Elcano was a precocious sailor who rose very quickly as a professional mariner. Nonetheless, he committed a serious infraction by selling his ship to the Savoyards, an illegal action at a time when wars were fought with ships. This infringement would cause him numerous problems in the following years.

After returning from the Mediterranean campaign, as he had legal problems it is likely that he remained in the Mediterranean, in Catalonia or in the Valencian Country, or perhaps also in Alicante. (In his will he left 24 ducats to the Alicante church of Santa Veronica.) However, at the end of June 1517 he appeared again in Getaria, as is known since he signed as a witness to the debt letter of a compatriot. It is possible his son with the young Getarian María Hernández Hernialde was conceived at that time, between 1517 and 1518, although they were not married, probably because Elcano did not have a stable residence. At the end of 1518 Elcano left Getaria and traveled to Seville to join Magellan's expedition. However, after returning from the expedition, at the age of 35 or 36, the king would forgive him that legal debt on February 13, 1523, and he was able to stabilize his situation in Valladolid.

== Voyage of circumnavigation ==
The Magellan-Elcano expedition (1519 - 1522), which completed the first circumnavigation of the Earth, started with 5 ships (Trinidad, San Antonio, Concepción, Victoria and Santiago) along with 234 crewmen (some sources raise the number of sailors to 247.) Although Elcano had departed Spain aboard the Concepción, the return voyage from the Moluccas to Seville was made by the single surviving ship, Victoria, captained by Elcano. Having sailed under extreme conditions, only 21 people arrived in Seville, 18 Europeans and 3 Moluccans.

To complete the round-the-world voyage, they had to sail 69,918 km (43,445 mi) After three years of rough passages, most of the sailors had died. A few made it back alive, but 147 men lost their lives, three-fifths of those who had set sail from Seville. This figure is a reflection of the number of unforeseen events, difficulties and vicissitudes they encountered during the voyage. Fifty-five had abandoned the circumnavigation, returning across the Atlantic aboard the San Antonio after deserting the expedition at the Strait of Magellan. Others returned across Asia or from Cape Verde: once they disembarked in Spain, they too had sailed around the world.

In addition to Elcano, the expedition included 34 other Basques, the largest representation after the Andalusians, along with 28 Portuguese, 19 Genoese and 21 Castilians. Nine of the Basques were with Elcano aboard the Concepción – Elcano and Juan de Acurio, Antonio Bermejo's boatswain, wanted trustworthy people around them.

=== Spice Islands ===
The course of the Magellan expedition

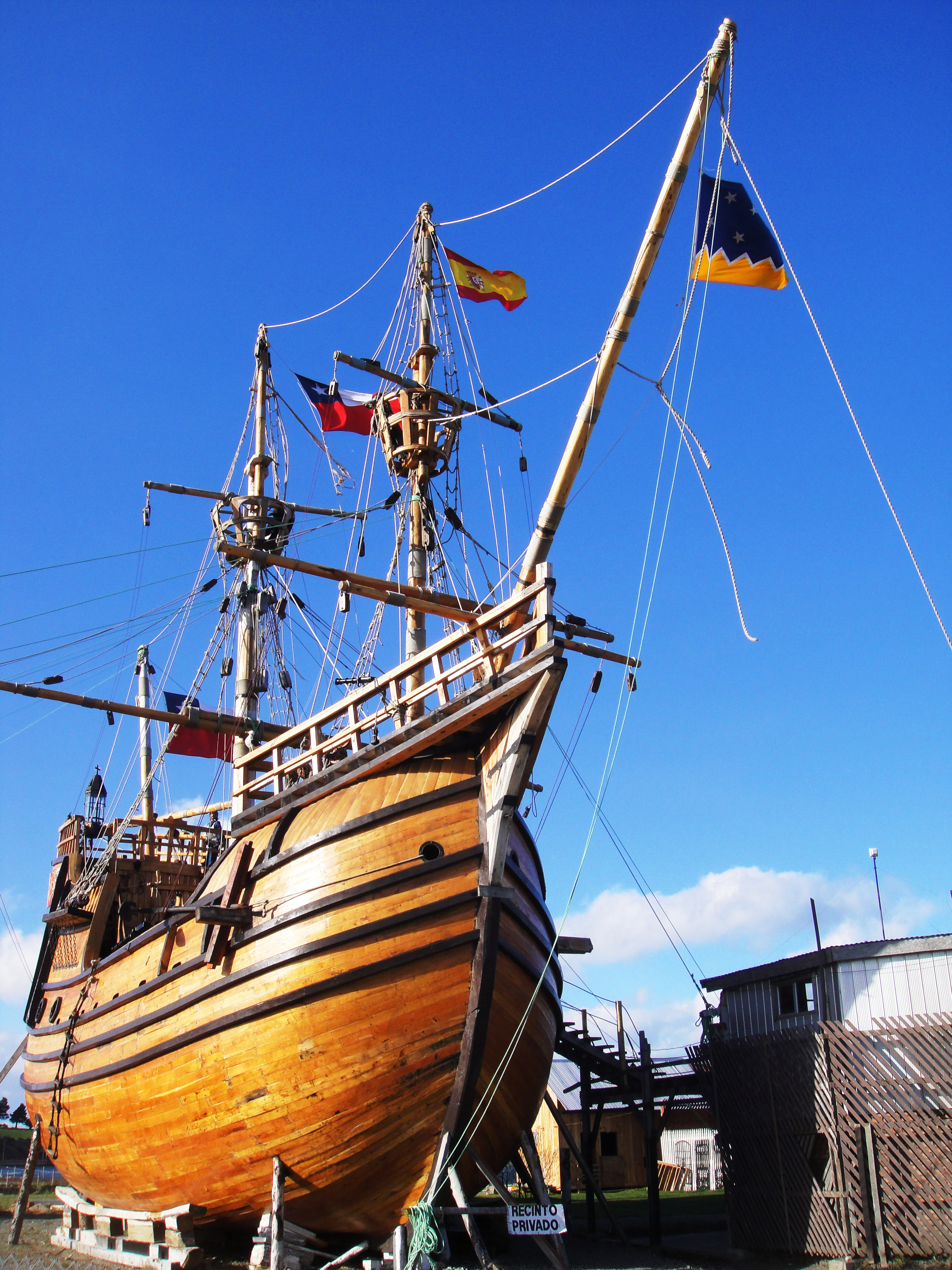
Nao Victoria, a replica of Elcano's ship, in Punta Arenas in southern Chile.

The fleet sailed across the Atlantic Ocean to the eastern coast of Brazil and into what is now Puerto San Julián in Argentina, and for several months they fruitlessly sought a passage to the Pacific. Elcano participated in a fierce mutiny. Magellan spared his life, and after five months of hard labour in chains Elcano was pardoned and made captain of the carrack. Santiago was later destroyed in a storm.

Several months later they discovered the passage now known as the Strait of Magellan, the passage between mainland South America and Tierra del Fuego, and sailed through. The crew of San Antonio mutinied and returned to Spain. On 28 November 1520, three ships set sail through the Pacific Ocean, and about 19 men died before they reached Guam on 6 March 1521. Conflicts with the nearby island of Rota prevented Magellan and Elcano from resupplying their ships with food and water. They eventually gathered enough supplies and continued their journey to the Philippines and remained there several weeks. Close relationships developed between the islanders and the Spaniards, who began to evangelize and convert the Cebuano tribes to Christianity; they also became involved in tribal warfare between rival Filipino groups on Mactan Island.

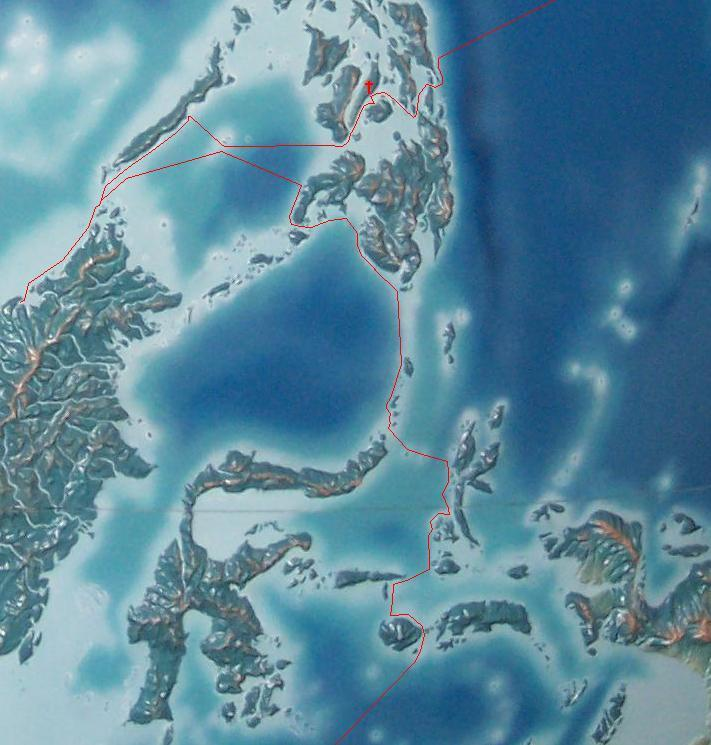
Route of the Spanish expedition through the Spice Islands. The red cross shows the location of Mactan Island in the Philippines, where Magellan was killed in 1521.

On 27 April 1521, Magellan was killed and the Spaniards defeated by natives in the Battle of Mactan in the Philippines.

=== Elcano under Magellan's leadership ===
Ferdinand Magellan was the expedition leader, though he was not a Spaniard but a Portuguese. He had traveled in his youth through South Asia with the Portuguese army, gaining invaluable knowledge of the islands and maritime trade routes. He claimed to know the exact location of the Moluccas, the fabulous Spice Islands, and told the Spanish King Charles V that they were in the Castilian hemisphere defined by the Treaty of Tordesillas, which would entitle Spain to all their wealth (though in the end this was found to be in error). To establish this claim, the expedition was mounted with Magellan as captain-general (capitán-general), and he closely guarded the secret of the Moluccas' location, quickly antagonizing Elcano. Magellan condemned Elcano for his participation in the San Julian revolt in Patagonia.

Elcano confessed his part in the mutinies against Magellan during his interrogation at Valladolid after the circumnavigation, adding that he had not written anything while Magellan was alive because he feared him. Magellan had been killed in the Philippines on April 27, 1521, by warriors from the island of Mactan.

Although the objective set by the king was to open the route to the Spice Islands, when they reached Asia, Magellan began to pursue his personal objectives. The king had promised to make him governor of those islands in the Castilian hemisphere and that he should enjoy commercial rights to the trade of the two main islands. This is probably why the expedition did not sail directly to the Moluccas to acquire spices, but wandered about further north, getting involved in the political conflicts of the local peoples.

=== Voyage after Magellan's death ===
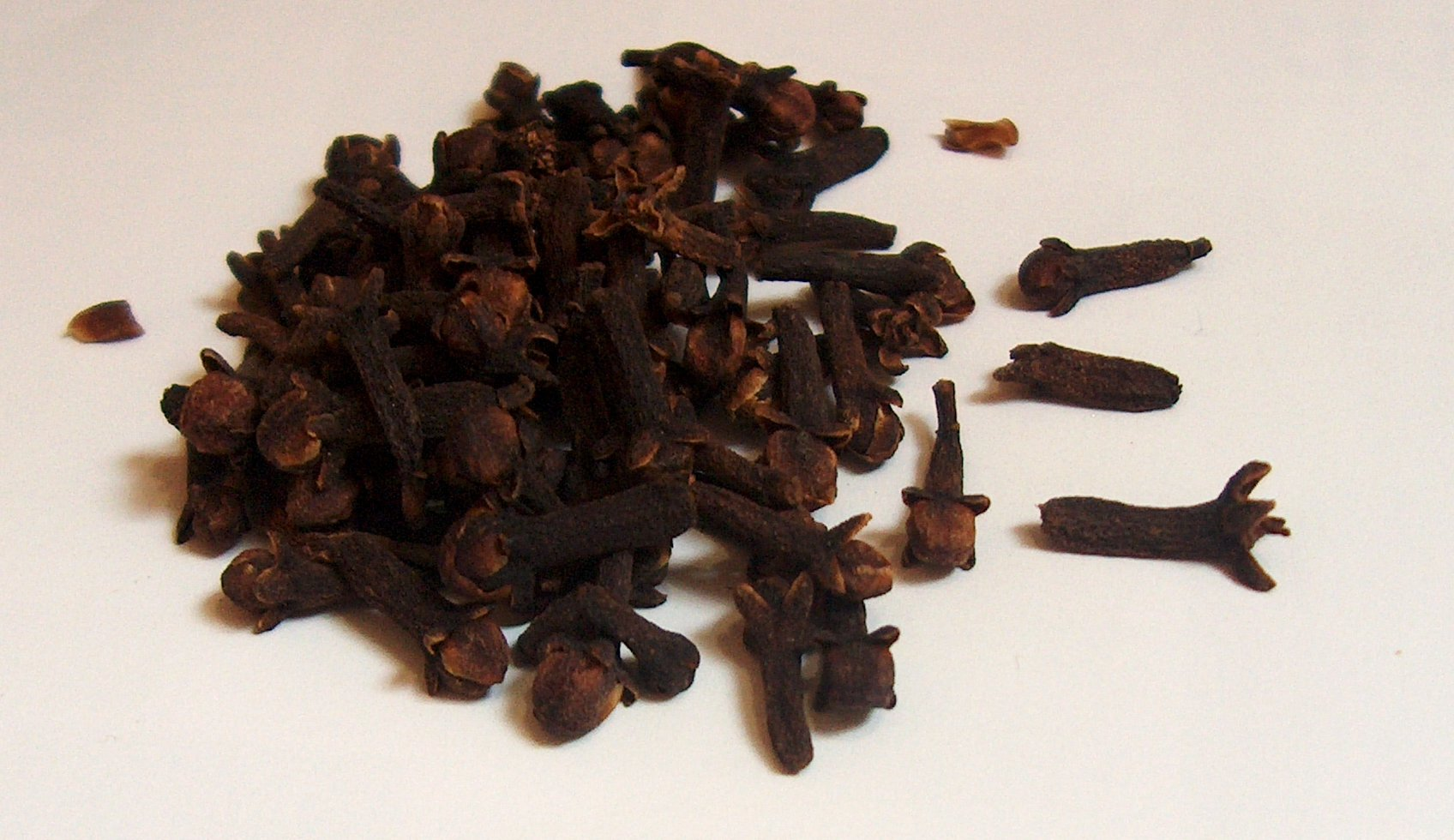
Cloves, the main object of the expedition.

After Magellan's death, the Portuguese Duarte Barbosa, a relative of Magellan, was appointed captain-general, but he also was killed on May 1 in Mactan, Cebu Island together with Captain João Serrão of the Trinidad and 35 sailors, murdered at a dinner by their host, Rajah Humabon. On May 2, the 166 surviving sailors, unable to man all three ships, decided to burn the Concepción.

By May 1521, the expedition had only two of the original five vessels for the return voyage, Victoria and Trinidad. Even now, Elcano was not immediately appointed captain, but rather another Portuguese, Juan Lopez de Carvalho. Elcano's stature grew in contrast with Carvalho's indecisive leadership, and on September 17, 1521 the sailors deposed Carvalho and elected Elcano as captain. There are several versions of the events between May and September leading up to the new leadership.

=== From Tidore to Cape Verde ===
The expedition finally reached Tidore in the Molucca Islands, in what is now Indonesia, where they found the precious clove spice in plenty. The local rajah, the Almansur of Tidore Island, arranged to gather tons of cloves from the neighboring islands, loading 27 tons on the Victoria alone. In the meantime, the Trinidad was disabled. Having heard of the approach of the Portuguese enemy, they decided to return alone on the Victoria, with Elcano as captain.

They had specific orders from the Crown to return by the route they had gone, staying in the Spanish hemisphere, but Elcano proposed to continue their westward course across the Indian Ocean and the Cape of Good Hope "to do what would be narrated", gaining the fame of a voyage around the world. It was this decision of Elcano that led to the circumnavigation. He later wrote to the King:

Your Majesty will know that we should have the highest esteem for having discovered and encircled the roundness of the world, for we have gone to the West and returned by the East.

Elcano allowed the sailors to choose their ship, since they were to proceed into waters belonging to Portugal. Forty seven chose to return with Elcano aboard the Victoria, and 13 to stay in the Moluccas with the Trinidad; of the twelve Basques left, eight stayed with Elcano.

The Victoria left Tidore Island on December 21, 1521, sailing into a strong storm which damaged the ship. On the nearby island of Mallua (Pulau Wetar) they remained fifteen days for repairs, then heading to the island of Timor. Again setting off on February 7, 1522, the expedition planned to sail without landing to Seville, a distance of 27,000 km (17,000 mi) kilometers, to avoid meeting the Portuguese. From Timor, the Victoria traveled west, on a line around 10° 32' South – probably within 500 km (310.69 mi) of the Australian mainland and passing close to Christmas Island and the Cocos Islands – before heading southwest, to avoid Portuguese India, and crossing the equator into the southern hemisphere. By going so far south, they also managed to avoid the opposing monsoon winds blowing from Africa that time of year. On March 18, the crew sighted an island that Elcano named Desesperanza ("Despair"; later known as Ile Amsterdam), because he was unable to find a safe place to land, and his crew was desperate for fresh water, 40 days out from Timor.

While they were still in the Indian Ocean, the crew of Victoria began to run out of food. They had only rice cooked in seawater left to eat, and scurvy began to make the sailors seriously ill. Under these circumstances, the idea of making landfall in Mozambique spread on the ship, despite the danger of capture by the Portuguese. Elcano consulted the crew, who decided by vote to continue sailing.

Rounding the perilous Cape of Good Hope, the "Cape of Storms", at first they headed south to take advantage of the wind, but the ship could not continue through the weather of those parts. For nine weeks they stayed freezing, sails lowered. At last Elcano proposed to round the Cape close to the African coast, defying the dangers of shipwreck and attack by the Portuguese. They pressed on, and at last managed to round the cape and head northward off the continent's western coast.

=== Landing in Cape Verde ===
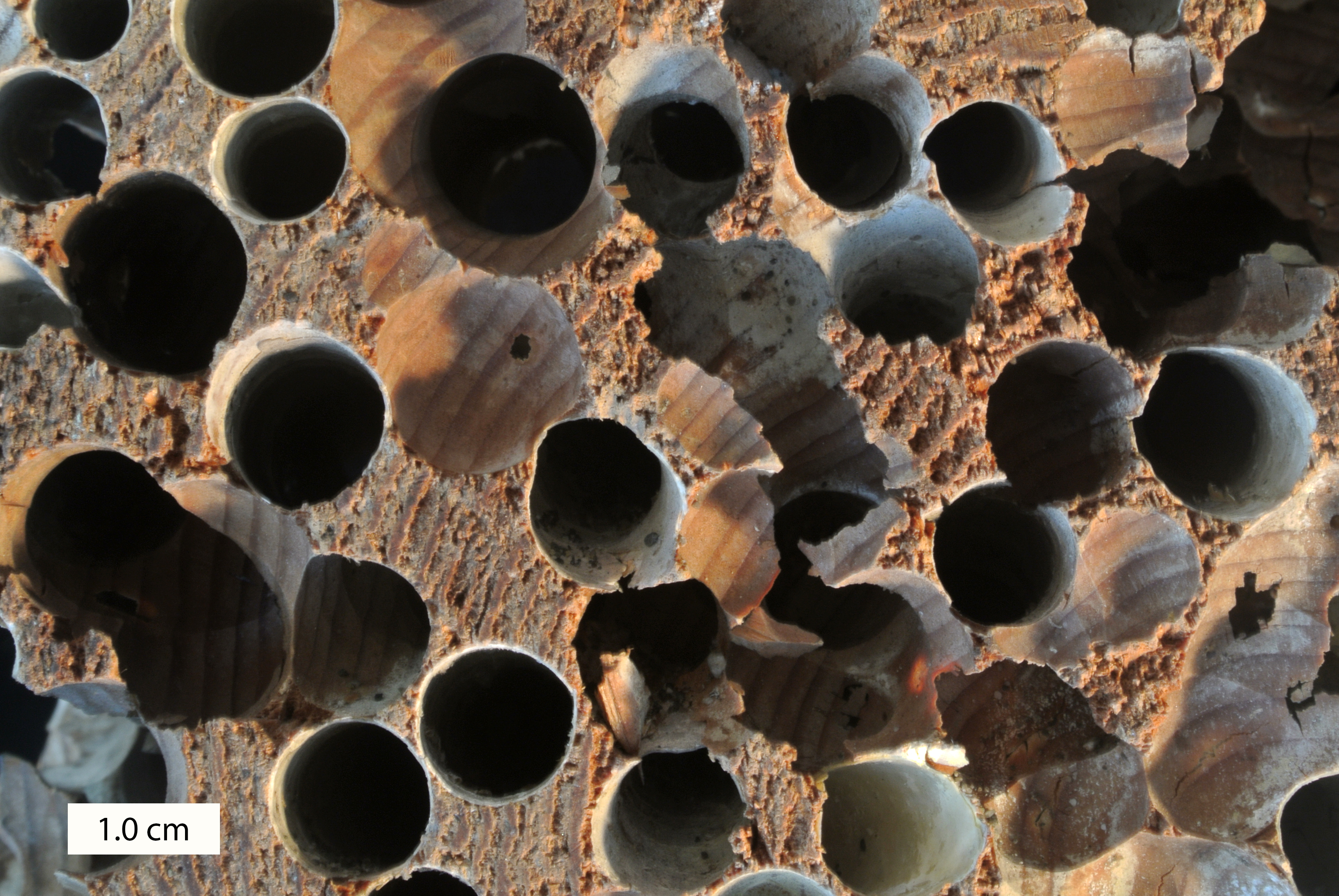
Teredo navalis is a mollusc that eats the wood of ships' hulls.

After 20,000 km (12,000 mi), sailing around all of Africa, their supplies, health, and the condition of Victoria had become impossible, with two or three deaths each week. The hull was leaking, eaten by shipworms, and the starving crew were too weak to pump out the bilges. Desperate for food, they first reconnoitered the African coast off Guinea Bissau and Senegal, but could not find a suitable place to land.

They finally decided by vote to call at the Portuguese island of Cape Verde on July 9 for resupply and repairs. They had no money or trade goods except cloves, but paying in cloves would reveal they were returning from an illicit voyage to Asia. Though they were somehow able to pay innocuously for the first two loads of food, but for their third purchase they were forced to draw on their spice cargo, revealing their identity to the Portuguese (though this is contested by scholars like Enrique Santamaría). Forced to flee the island, they had to leave behind 13 sailors who were imprisoned by the Portuguese.

It is not entirely clear whether the third risky purchase at Cape Verde was for provisions or slaves. Most original accounts, including Elcano's, speak only of food, but the ship's barber surgeon Hernando de Bustamante said they needed slaves, then commonly sold by the Portuguese, to pump out the leaking bilge water.

=== Arrival ===
Struggling on the last leg to Seville, they were blown off course. By volta do mar largo, they swung wide to the west and almost as far north as Galicia, then southward to return to the Spanish coast. They landed at Sanlúcar de Barrameda on September 6, 1522, and on September 8, Victoria entered Seville harbor after almost three years of voyaging. Of the 234 (or 247) sailors who set sail, only 18 returned.

As soon as the ship arrived in Sanlúcar de Barrameda, Elcano began writing a 700-word letter to King Charles V recounting the voyage. He never mentions himself, but emphasises that the expedition had achieved its goal of bringing back a spice cargo, and in addition had "brought peace" to the Spice Islands, obtaining the friendship of their kings and lords as attested by their signatures on documents. He recounted the extreme hardships of the crew, and did not forget the men captured in Cape Verde by the Portuguese, begging the king to ransom them. He ends by proclaiming their proof of the roundness of the world, setting sail to the west and coming back from the east.

== After the voyage ==
=== Court of Valladolid ===
Upon arriving in Seville, Elcano and a few selected crew took the road to Valladolid, the court of Charles V. The king wanted Elcano to personally tell him about the expedition. The king invited Elcano and two others, 'those who have better sense', but Elcano brought more with him, including the three men from the Moluccas.

Augmented coat of arms granted to Juan Sebastián Elcano

The king received Elcano in Valladolid at most one month after his return. Elcano gave his account of the voyage, possibly in three conversations: first with the king, perhaps in private; then with the court experts, to clarify technical and financial matters and to describe the events of the voyage, accounting for the mutiny and deaths; and finally, with a group of learned humanists interested in the various cultures that the expedition encountered. He would spend three years in Valladolid, near the Court. There he joined María Bidaurreta (in some sources De Vida Urreta) and had another daughter.

Charles V granted Elcano an augmentation of his coat of arms featuring a world globe with the words Primus circumdedisti me (Latin: "You first encircled me"). However, this augmentation has been contested, as Elcano was not previously a member of the nobility. Elcano claimed three gifts from the king as a reward for his achievement, namely an annual pension of 500 ducats which he never received, two armed men to escort him and an official statement pardoning him for the sale of his ship to the Savoyard bankers. Following Elcano's death and after lengthy lawsuits, his mother Catalina del Puerto never managed to obtain any of his pension. By 1567, after she too had died, Elcano's heirs and other relatives continued to demand that the pension be honored. His male heirs were given the hereditary title of Marquis of Buglas, i.e., Negros Island in the Philippines. In the modern era, the country with the most people surnamed "Elcano" is currently the Philippines.

=== Relations with Portugal ===
The king of Portugal, John III, filed a piracy complaint against Elcano for theft of the cargo of cloves from the Moluccas, as they were part of his domains, and for his escape from Cape Verde with the precious cargo. He petitioned the King of Castile to return the cloves and to arrest and punish Elcano. King Charles V disregarded the request and protected Elcano.

Portugal and Castile both claimed the Moluccas Islands. The need to revise the Treaty of Tordesillas was not easy to resolve. Without knowing the exact size of the world, it was difficult to place those islands in a certain area. The key was to fix the location of the anti-meridian relative to the meridian established in the Treaty of Tordesillas, the two meridians forming a great circle that divides the earth into two hemispheres, to determine on which side of the antimeridian the Moluccas Islands were located. Meetings to resolve the matter were held in 1524 in the towns of Elvas and Badajoz along the border between Spain and Portugal. Five of the six Basques who circumnavigated the world participated in these assemblies.

To accurately establish this antimeridian, each of the Crowns assembled the best cosmographers of the time. Each delegation appointed three astronomers or cartographers, three sea pilots and three mathematicians. The Spanish delegation also appointed Fernando Colón, son of Christopher Columbus, with the objective of determining the location of the Moluccas. The negotiating team included Sebastian Cabot (Sebastián Caboto), Juan Vespucio, Diogo Ribeiro, Estêvão Gomezs, Simón Alcazaba and Diego López de Sigueiro.

In the Badajoz-Elvas assemblies, the most authoritative voice of the Castilian delegation was Elcano himself, who devoted himself to his work as a cosmographer. He brought to these meetings a sphere of the world he made himself, on which some accounts say he had marked the trajectory of the round-the-world voyage. These meetings were unsuccessful because the attendant parties were unable to agree on the exact location of the Moluccas Islands, as it could not be deduced from the ships' logs, and in any case the Portuguese did not recognize Elcano's authority. It is not known exactly why, but suddenly Elcano and the pilot Estêvão Gomes were absent from those meetings on March 15, 1524. Shortly thereafter, on May 20, 1524, the king pronounced his support of Elcano, as it was said that there were those who wanted to harm him (the royal charter speaks of "wounded, dead or crippled"), and three days later, on May 23, 1524, the assembly met again in Badajoz, but without Elcano. The conjecture is that he was threatened by the Portuguese in the case of the alleged piracy in the Moluccas. By October 1524 Elcano was in the Basque Country preparing for a second expedition to the Moluccas. In 1529, John III of Portugal and Charles V of Castile signed the Treaty of Zaragoza, Castile recognizing the Moluccas as being on the Portuguese side of the antimeridian of the line of demarcation previously specified in the Treaty of Tordesillas.

== Last expedition ==
In 1525, Elcano was back at sea as a member of the Loaísa expedition to the Moluccas with García Jofre de Loaísa, who had been appointed by Charles V as captain-general of a fleet composed of seven ships. Loaísa was in command of the carrack (Spanish: nao) Santa María de la Victoria, the fleet's flagship, while Elcano was named pilot-major of the expedition, in command of Sancti Spiritus, with his brother Martín Pérez serving as its pilot. They were sent by Charles V to claim the Indies in his name, a venture that was irksome to Portugal.

The expedition, financed by German international banking and merchant families, the Fuggers and the Welsers, sailed from A Coruña in July 1525. It consisted of four carracks, two caravels and a patache, with 450 sailors to crew them. Its purpose was securing a military foothold in the Maluccas, and forming alliances with the native rulers to gain control of the local spice trade with the establishment of a base for the Spanish Crown's mercantile and colonial agents.

Although Elcano had more experience, the king chose García Jofre de Loaísa as commander of the expedition because he was a nobleman, his status in line with the royal objective of establishing a Castilian authority in the Moluccas. Elcano was accompanied by his brothers Martín Pérez, Ochoa Martín and Antón Martín, his nephew Esteban Mutio, and his brother-in-law Santiago de Guevara, captain of Santiago.

Elcano's influence was evident in the preparations for the expedition. Of the seven ships, four had been built in Basque territory and the number of natives of the Gipuzkoan coast in the crew had increased considerably, including those in positions of responsibility, compared to the first expedition. Many of them were close to Elcano.

The expedition faced numerous misfortunes. Before reaching the strait, two vessels were lost because they couldn't find its entrance. The Sancti Spiritus, piloted by Elcano, ran aground in a storm and was abandoned, with its men being distributed among the other ships, and the San Gabriel deserted the expedition, returning to Castile after sailing up the Brazilian coast. The remaining ships completed their passage through the Strait of Magellan on 26 May 1526, and set out for the Pacific crossing. A storm scattered the ships on June 2 and only one, Victoria, remained. Another of the ships ended up in Zihuatanejo, Mexico.

=== Death ===
The ship continued to the Moluccas in poor condition, and the crew suffered the ravages of scurvy. The accountant Alonso de Tejada, the pilot Antonio Bermejo and thirty-two other crew members died. Finally, General Loaisa himself died on 30 July. Elcano then took command of the navigation, and was named captain-general, a position he had been promised by the king from the beginning. After a short time he died of scurvy, probably on 6 August 1526. All his relatives who accompanied him also died, except, perhaps, his brother Ochoa Martín, who may have been aboard the ship that landed at Zihuatanejo. In one of the documents that appeared later in Laurgain, dated January 29, 1529, the king calls "Johan Ochoa Martínez del Cano" to go on the expedition of Simón de Alcazaba to the Moluccas. If this referred to Elcano's brother, then he was still alive in 1529. Before dying, Juan Sebastián had made a will – one of those signing as a witness was Andrés de Urdaneta.

On August 7, Elcano's body was wrapped in a shroud and tied to a board with ropes. Afterwards, it was placed on the deck of the ship while the surviving men recited the "Lord's Prayer" and the Ave Maria (Hail Mary). When they finished, a weight was tied to the shroud, and Alonso de Salazar, the new captain general of the Army, nodded his head. The four sailors tilted the plank over the gunwale until the weight of the corpse caused it to drop into the sea.

== Writings by Elcano ==
Two letters addressed to King Charles V and a will are the only documents in Elcano's own handwriting known to have survived to the present day. In the interrogations at Seville before the expedition and at Valladolid after its completion, the answers given by Elcano were also recorded in writing and have also survived. Elcano's voice can be heard in them.

While Magellan was alive Elcano wrote nothing, because he feared Magellan's wrath; he addressed this point in the Valladolid interrogations. After Magellan's death, however, following Elcano's appointment as captain, he began to write down (as he himself said in the Valladolid investigation) what had happened and what he had seen. This chronicle of the first world circumnavigation, written by his own hand, has been lost. Along with Elcano's account, the other important written chronicles of the voyage, including Magellan's or Pigaffeta's originals, are also lost. In the case of Magellan and Elcano a hypothesis has been proposed that both their writings could be translated in the Latin chronicle of the royal secretary Maximilianus Transylvanus, and that the main passages of the chronicle written by Elcano have survived in the contemporary chronicles rewritten by Maximilianus Transylvanus and Gonzalo Fernández de Oviedo.

=== First Letter to Charles V ===
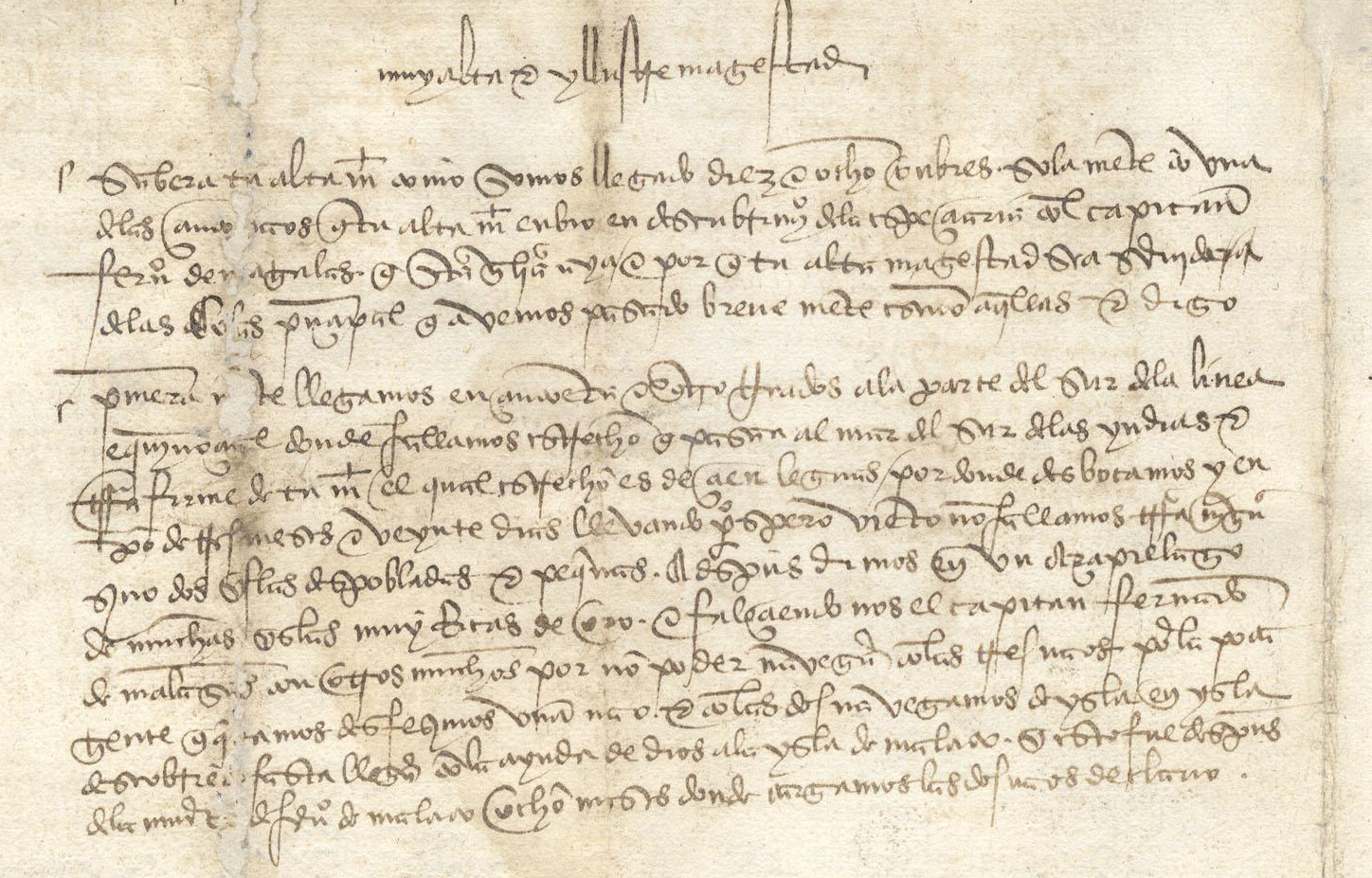
First letter to Charles V written by Elcano.

The first letter was written in Sanlúcar de Barrameda to let the king know that he has returned from his circumnavigation. The text is precise and correct, as merchants, unlike diplomats, usually write. He promises the king documents, letters of submission from the monarchs of the remote island and samples of spices to account for the success of the voyage. He also brings with him five parrots, which were appreciated at the Court. He explains in 10 lines what happened up to the death of Magellan and, subsequently, what happened in his charge in the other 40–45. It is at that point that he asks the king to make an effort to free the 13 who have been detained in Cape Verde. He asks for a financial reward from Charles V, but mentions that the feat was accomplished by collective decision.

=== Second Letter to Charles V ===
The purpose of the second letter was to ask for bonuses. Approximately 40 days after returning from the voyage around the world, Elcano arrived at the Court of Valladolid where the king received his request to name him captain-general. In it he also asked the king for the commercial rights of trade in the Moluccas or the habit of the Order of Santiago, which were entrusted by the king to Magellan. The king's secretary (Francisco de los Cobos) denied all of these requests. Apparently he was not accorded respect at the Court of Castile, and they did not want to give Elcano the orders that had been promised to Magellan. Santamaría argues that this animadversion was caused by Elcano's lack of noble status. It took him months to obtain the other three bonuses he had been promised – a pension, a pardon and the right to an armed guard – probably as a result of the rapprochement with the Court.

=== Elcano's will ===
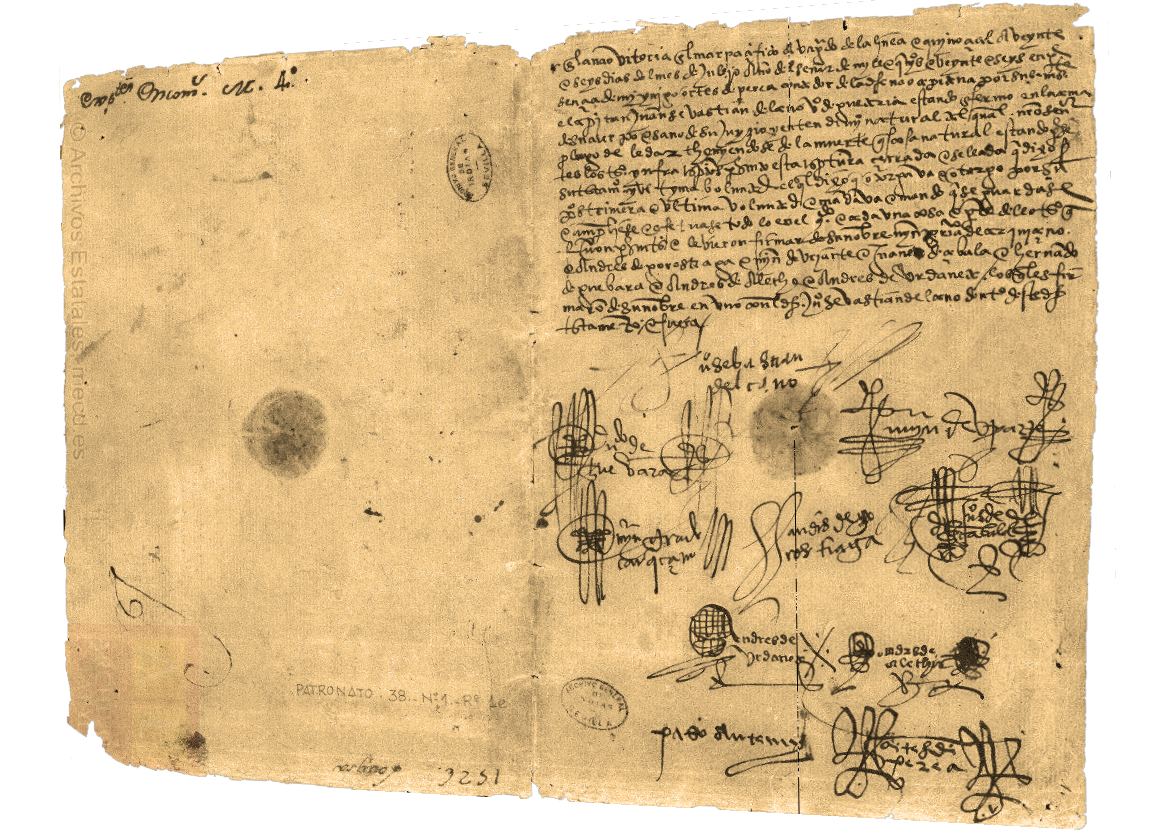
Elcano's will.

The will is also a source of information about Elcano's personal life. In addition to citing all his claimed assets in great detail, it speaks of his family. It shows that although he never married, he had sexual relationships with at least two women, both of them Basque or of Basque origin, and each of whom bore his child. His son Domingo was born before the world circumnavigation and his daughter María afterwards.

The will was drawn up on July 26, 1526, and opened by the president of the Council of the Indies upon his arrival in Seville, ten years after it was made. All seven witnesses to the will were Basques, which is surprising, given the situation and the location in the middle of the Pacific, a clear indication of trust and solidarity among them. The witnesses were Martín García Karkizano, Andrés Gorostiaga, Hernando Gebara, Andrés Urdaneta, Juanes Zabala, Martín Uriarte and Andrés Aletxe.

In his will Elcano left money to churches such as San Salvador de Getaria, Itziar, Sasiola (Deba), Our Lady of Arantzazu, San Pelayo in Zarautz and Nuestra Señora de Guadalupe in Hondarribia. However, he stipulated that these bequests should be paid out of the money owed him by the king according to the terms of their agreement, funds which he never received. This leaving of money to the church only if he were paid by the King has been used by Santamaría to dismiss the idea of Elcano being a very religious man.

He also left portions of those funds to his heirs, but if they died, as happened, his mother would receive the benefit of his properties. He treated the four of them generously in the distribution of goods: one hundred ducats of gold to Domingo's mother (37,500 maravedís), and another 40 ducats (15,000 maravedís) to the daughter, if she married, as a dowry. He requested that his daughter be taken from Valladolid to Getaria when she turned 4 years old, because Getaria was closer to his heart than the Court of Valladolid.

Thanks to the will, it is known that Elcano owned two books written in Latin, indicating that he knew how to read that language. Both books refer to astronomy, one being the Almanac of Regiomontanus, which allowed navigators to determine longitude at sea with observations of the moon. These two books were left to Andrés San Martín, his pilot cosmographer who disappeared on the circumnavigation, if he should be found alive. This suggests that in the second expedition Elcano was still hoping to find a companion lost in the first expedition.

In 1533, seven years after Elcano's death, his mother was still in court with the royal treasury seeking the salaries corresponding to the rank of captain due to her son and the other payments he never received, and his pension of 500 ducats per year. The will also shows that Elcano did not own slaves, otherwise he would have had to cite them.

=== Transylvanus's text ===
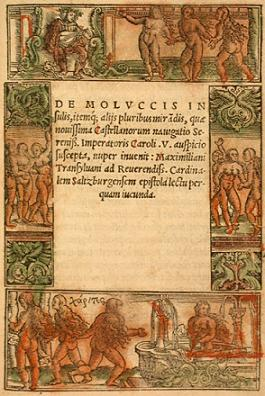
Transylvanus's De Moluccis Insulis, a text with two parts. Modern researchers argue that the texts are taken directly from Magellan's and Elcano's accounts, and that this explains why the two parts are so different.

The humanist Maximilianus Transylvanus was present at the royal court, listening to Elcano. From what he heard he wrote his own chronicle of the voyage, in the form of a letter, which he sent to his patron, Matteo Lang von Wellenburg. The book was printed in Cologne in January 1523 and in November of that year another printing was made in Rome by Gian Matteo Giberti, assistant to Pope Clement VII. Giovanni Battista Ramusio years later assembled a collection of travels and introduced the text of Transylvanus. The text was written in Latin, for political purposes and according to the tastes of Chancellor Gattinara. It is possible that this text by Transylvanus is a compilation of collected testimonies: the account of Magellan's part of the voyage is very different from that of Elcano's part, as if they had two different authors. Another chronicler of the time who read these two texts, Fernandez de Oviedo, alluded to the parity between the texts of Elcano and Transylvanus: "It is almost him", he wrote.

If the second part of the Transylvanus text is a direct translation of Elcano's report, he appears as an exponent of the humanist and utopian intellectual movements then current in Europe, and the text, which says that the societies of the Moluccas were peaceful, treated their neighbors well and were hospitable to foreigners can be seen as one of the first explications of the myth of the noble savage and a critique of the corruption of European civilization:

All of them show great respect and care not to cause harm or discomfort to neighboring towns, even more so to neighbors from neighboring islands, and even more so to foreigners or pilgrims.

Basque philosopher Ekai Txapartegi defends the proposition that Transylvanus's text was written by Elcano, asserting that its description of the island of Borneo as a utopia and its depiction of the customs of the inhabitants reveals the humanist aspect of his political thought, as well as his opposition to the expansionist ambitions of empire and warlike kings, and the imposition of the Christian faith on peaceful pagan societies. A similar approach is defended by Enrique Santamaría. Not much is said in the text about the events that transpired when the expedition was in Borneo, only that they talked to the local king, made some exchanges and moved on. What they were doing there is not explained in the passage, although it is known that Borneo was the scene of conflict for the travelers, indicating that the writer is speaking more of his personal utopian vision than of a literal description of Borneo.

== Historiography ==
Elcano's achievement has been eclipsed in traditional historiography by that of Magellan, who planned and led the famous expedition until he died before it reached the Spice Islands. More recently, Portugal's solo candidacy to UNESCO to get Magellan's expedition and the resulting circumnavigation (without mentioning Elcano) recognised as a Portuguese Intangible World Heritage has provoked a major controversy with Spain, thereafter seemingly settled by the submission by said countries of a new joint application to honour the circumnavigation route. According to the Basque historian Xabier Alberdi Lonbide, Elcano was relegated to a secondary role in French and Spanish historiography of the 19th century and there remains a minor figure. Lonbide writes that the maritime heritage of the Basque Country generally has been consigned to oblivion in British, French, and Spanish historiography, and that Basque historiography has not managed to overcome this situation, although in the Basque Country Elcano is regarded as the most universal representative of Basque culture, and he has greater stature.

=== Elcano, deleted from History ===
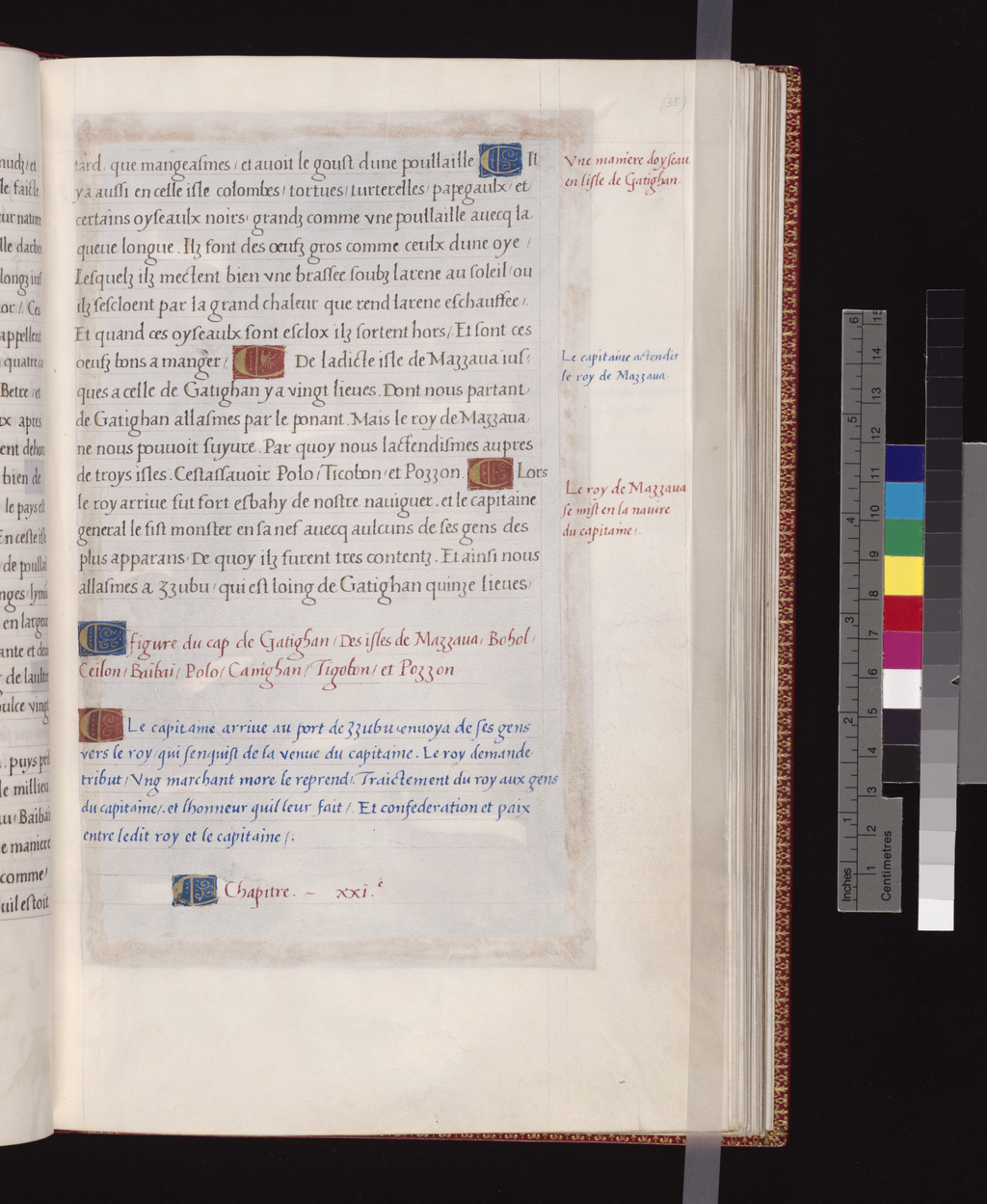
A page from Pigafetta's book, in French. The only surviving copy of the book seems to be a translation to Italian from the French translation.

Throughout the world Elcano has been a marginal character because he was almost forgotten for three centuries. In the first accounts of the voyage, the cold reception that the successful circumnavigation of the world got at the Court of Castile is noticeable; in the long seventeen-page account written by Peter Martyr d'Anghiera, for example, Elcano was not mentioned even once. The reason for this neglect is perhaps that those who sailed around the world were not hidalgos, but common sailors, a fact that contravened late medieval social attitudes among the upper classes.

Nor did the book, Relazione del primo viaggio intorno al mondo, by Antonio Pigafetta, the Venetian scholar who sailed with Magellan and who was among the 18 men that survived the expedition and returned to Spain, mention Elcano. In its received form, his chronicle exaggerates his own role, perhaps explaining why in Italian historiography Elcano disappears and Capitano Pigafetta himself appears as an important character.

In recent years, however, another point of view has spread: Pigafetta quoted Elcano, but as the works of Pigafetta that have survived to modern times were modified in transmission, perhaps mentions of Elcano were suppressed. The original Pigafetta chronicle is lost, and the account in its present form would be a retranslation of a translation made in France, written later, and suppressing or modifying many sections. The hypothesis is that, since France was at war with Castile, the French eliminated all the "Spaniards" that Pigafetta had praised in his telling of the voyage. This 'eliminatory' view was further extended when it was written by Philip II's chronicler, embellishing the roles of the hidalgos Magellan and Pigafetta and minimising that of the plebeians. Spanish historiography transformed Magellan into a leader who favored the unity of Portugal and Spain, although he had betrayed Portugal by becoming Castilian. Thus, he became a hero for the Castilians whose political position was consequently enhanced.

It was in the interest of Castile to elevate Magellan, and to push Elcano aside, but also of the Catholic Church. The tug of war between the empire of Charles V and the Roman Catholic Church was constant. The Holy Roman Empire presented itself as a Catholic Empire, but at the same time it did not control the center of religion, that is, Rome. The Church did not want Charles V to have too much power. Therefore, the Church wanted to mark a contrast between the bloody evangelisation that Spain carried out in the Americas and the supposedly peaceful evangelisation that Portugal carried out in Asia. Since it was convenient for it to emphasize that Spain's attempt at evangelisation had been drenched with blood, while Portugal's was a builder of civilization, the Church found it advantageous to praise Magellan. Thus, Magellan was praised by Rome and England, who were allied with Portugal against Spain. Magellan was taken as a model of civilization, and Francis Drake as the executor of his dream.

Although many technical and economic documents have survived, most of the originals have disappeared; their existence is known because these documents are cited by those who received the records of the times. Neither the actual text of the chronicle of Elcano's voyage, records of the proceedings of the trial of Carvalho, the documentation provided by Elcano at the Badajoz-Elvas meetings, nor the ship's logbook have been found. The Trinidad ship's book has also been lost, although it was taken by Portugal. Historian Enrique Santamaría believes these documents have been destroyed, probably in the 19th century; he finds it difficult to credit that they were lost, they being of immense historical value, and observes that documents with many other details of the voyage have survived.

=== Navarrete's account ===
Fernandez de Navarrete's account of Spanish conquests his findings.

In the context of the Napoleonic Wars, feelings of nationalism arose in most European countries. In Spain this sentiment had a conservative component supported by the monarchy, that in its retrospective view, held that the Spanish people needed to construct a new national historiography; this task fell to Martín Fernández de Navarrete, director of the Royal Academy of History. In 1825 Fernández de Navarrete wrote a modern 'official' account of the first circumnavigation of the earth, Colección de los viajes y descubrimientos que hicieron por mar los españoles, in which Magellan is praised, and the figure of Elcano passed down by tradition was remade.

At a time when Spain was experiencing the decolonization of America, the Spanish government desired to present a national historical narrative that legitimized the power of the ruling elites, a message that inevitably would diminish the position of the lower classes. In Navarrete's telling Magellan became an exemplar of those elevated persons who must struggle against the incapacity of common men to understand the complexities of governance, portraying him as of noble character, an upholder of the Christian faith, and a leader in the advancement of civilization. In contrast to these virtuous qualities he attributed to Magellan, Elcano was a man in the habit of deciding important matters democratically by vote, one who had never conquered another race of people that could be evangelized and civilized, nor had he ever even tried. Thus, in Navarrete's account, crediting Elcano with the completion of the first circumnavigation is understood as an injustice to the memory of Magellan's achievements, and Navarette's history is an attempt to rectify this error. The historical conception of a Spanish nation as presented by Navarrete has subsequently been propagated by historians of other nationalities, and remained a dominant view internationally for many years.

=== Later constructions ===
In 1861 the soldier Juan Cotarelo Garastazu, a field marshal (mariscal de campo) of the Spanish army, wrote the first biography of Elcano. He writes that Elcano was "humble and obedient" and that he had managed to sail around the world in obedience to his king, submitting as proof that in the rigorous Valladolid inquiry concerning the circumnavigation, Elcano responded in a humble, modest way to the thirteen questions he was asked.

Eustaquio Fernández de Navarrete, grandson of Martín Fernández de Navarrete, wrote a more complete biography of Elcano in 1872. This biography has a more neutral, analytical approach to its subject and has been the main reference for historians. As it was problematic for some people that Elcano lacked a noble pedigree, in order to vindicate his reputation, Eustaquio Fernández de Navarrete suggested, without providing any proof, that Elcano had taken part in the Siege of Oran and in the Italian wars.

=== From Cánovas to the Francoism ===
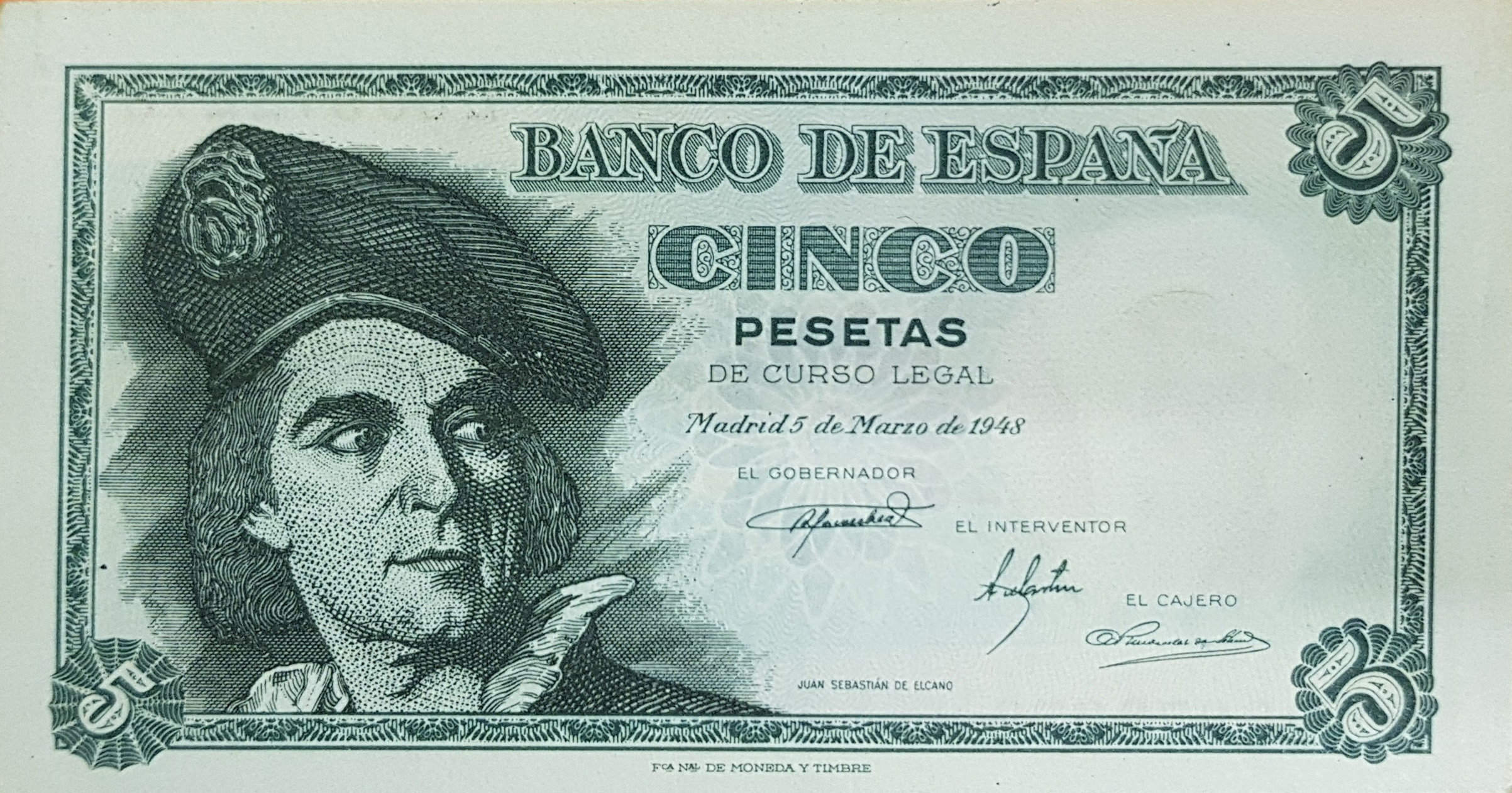
Five pesetas banknote with a portrait of Elcano, 1948.

Elcano was a posthumous victim of political machinations in the 19th century when Antonio Cánovas del Castillo faced the creation of peripheral Basque nationalist movements and fuerismo concerning the laws (fueros) of the different provinces of the Basque region; this occurred in a chaotic scenario after the overthrow of the First Spanish Republic. The so-called foral laws set up a legal framework in which authority was shared between the monarchy, whose agencies governed local affairs of interest to the Crown, and provincial institutions, which managed their own affairs concerning local traditions and customs. Cánovas believed that the foralists used a distorted history to defend their politics and, for this reason he wanted to minimize the role of the Basques and the Navarrese in Iberian history. Thus, he tried to disappear not only Elcano, but also Blas de Lezo, Churruca, Andrés de Urdaneta, and Legazpi from this history, establishing a damnatio memoriae. To eradicate Elcano's place as a heroic figure, Cánovas reinforced the use of the Portuguese Magellan as a symbol of the political unity of the Iberian Peninsula, averring that Elcano was no more than the "humble master" (modesto maestre) of the ship Victoria that completed the first circumnavigation of the Earth.

Prime Minister of Spain Primo de Rivera, however, wanted to restore Elcano's reputation and named a training ship of the Spanish Navy, Juan Sebastián de Elcano (A-71), after him. Franco's regime tried to make Elcano a national mythical figure, using the narrative written by Eustaquio Fernández de Navarrete (1872).

Amado Melón Ruiz de Gordejuela in his book Magallanes o la Primera Vuelta al Mundo, published in 1940 in the collection La España Imperial, affirmed that Elcano participated in the siege of Oran and was an assistant to "The Great Captain", Gonzalo Fernandez de Cordova, who campaigned in Italy between 1495 and 1504. Melón Ruiz wanted to place Elcano in Oran, and added 10 years to his age (otherwise he would have been only 8 years old), and promulgated the fiction that Elcano was born in 1476 rather than 1487. With the acceptance of this fabricated birth date by historians, the false information that Elcano participated in the Oran campaign has been widely published in history books.

=== 500th anniversary ===
The 500th anniversary of the first circumnavigation was celebrated in Spain on September 6, 2022. In view of this, several initiatives such as the Elkano Foundation have arisen, both to complete the history and perpetuate its memory and to plan the celebration of the event.

As part of the commemoration of the 500th anniversary of the first circumnavigation of the Earth on September 6, 1522, the Basque Maritime Museum, with the support of the Elkano Foundation, has published a new book: Elcano y el País Vasco. Cómo se hizo posible la primera vuelta al mundo (June 2022).

== Elcano in art ==
There is no description or contemporary artwork depicting Elcano, and all artworks depicting him were made centuries later, often with ahistorical elements in their composition and featuring anachronistic clothing.

=== Paintings ===
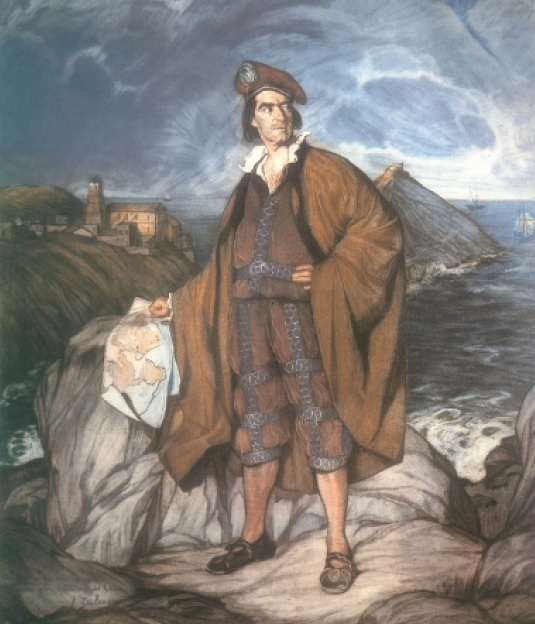
Juan Sebastian Elcano, and his birthplace, Getaria by Ignacio Zuloaga. The man depicted is the doctor, Pío Gogorza.

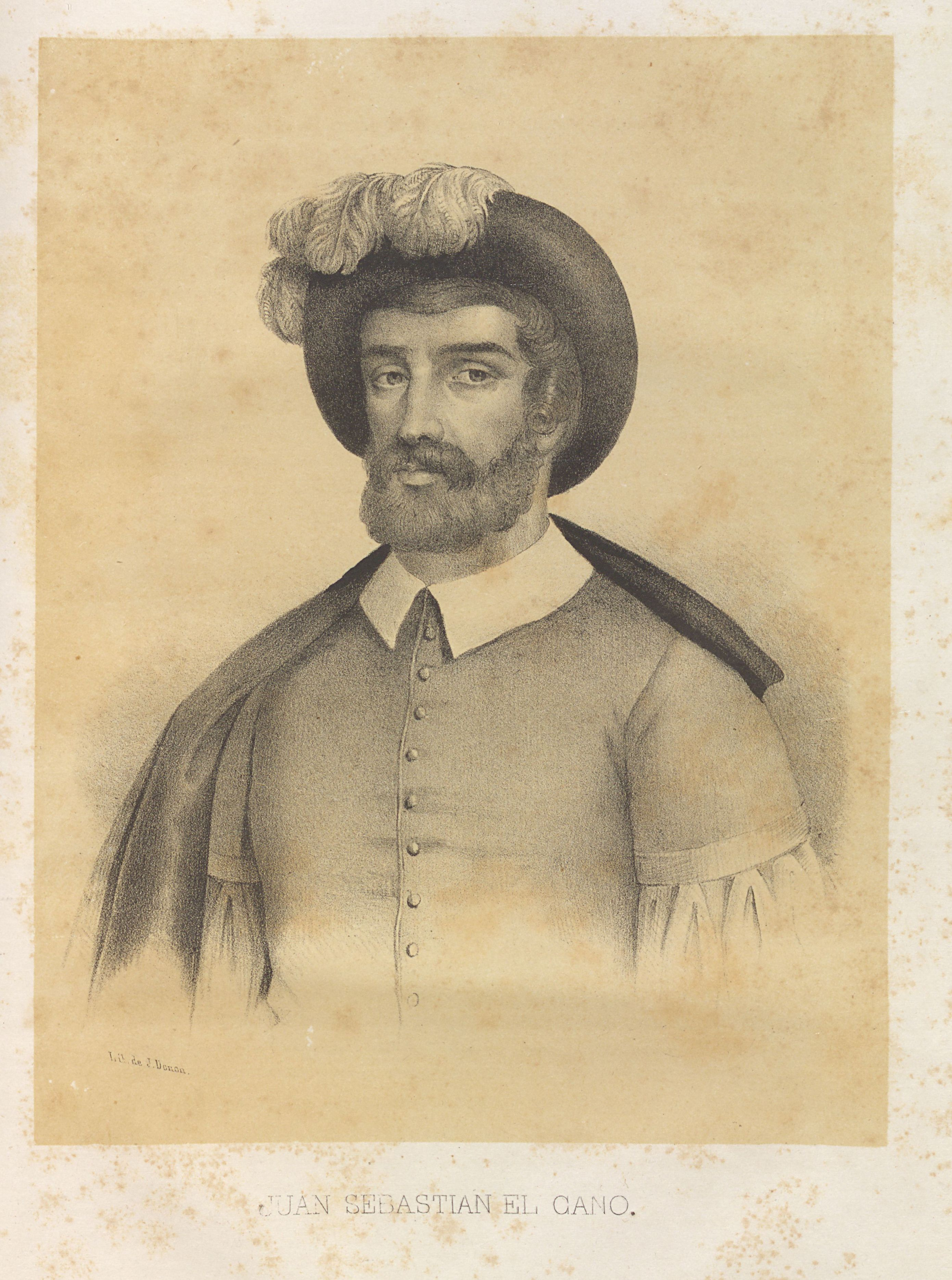
José Ferrer de Couto's 1865 engraving

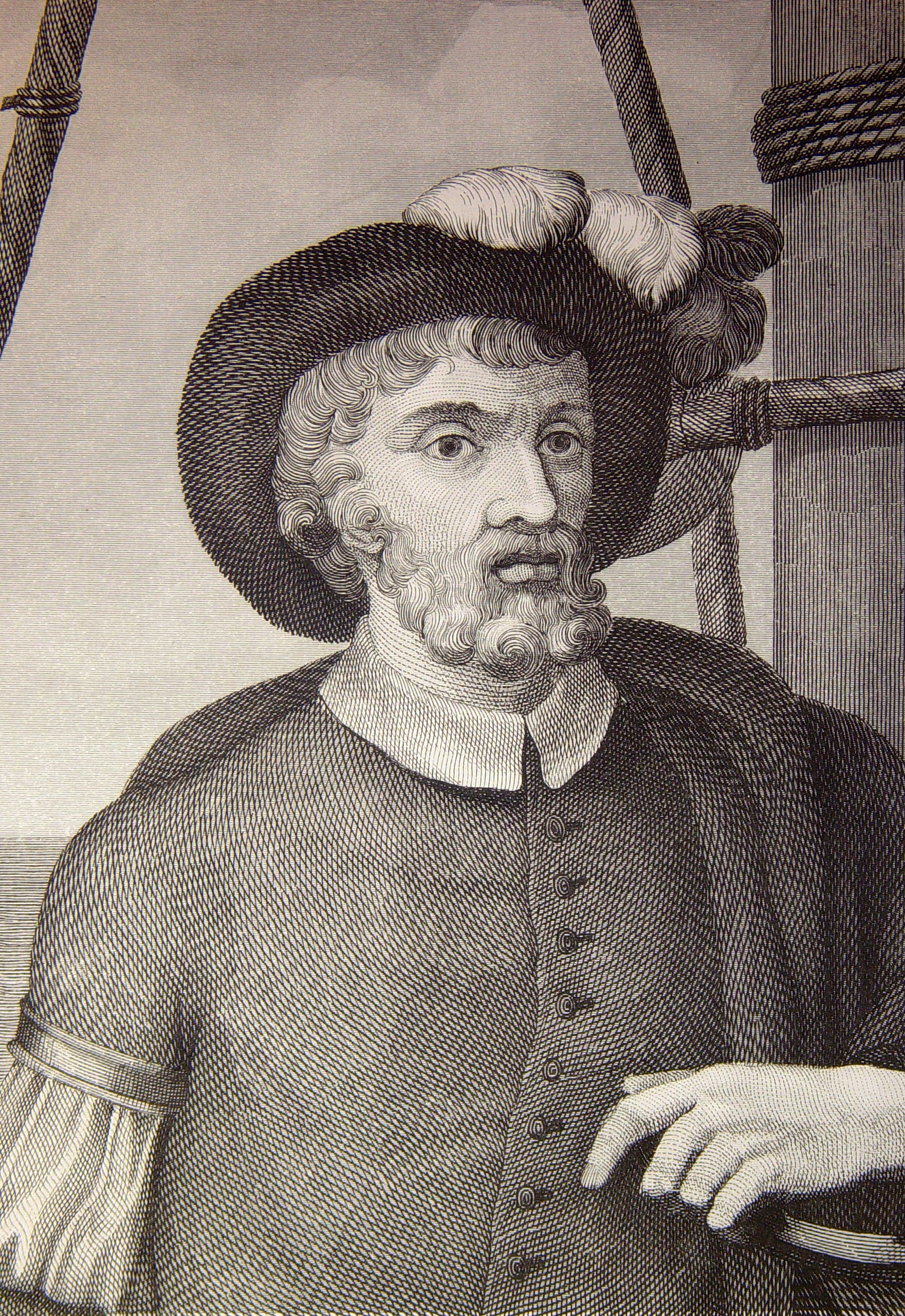
Las glorias nacionales, by the printer Luis Tasso, 1852.

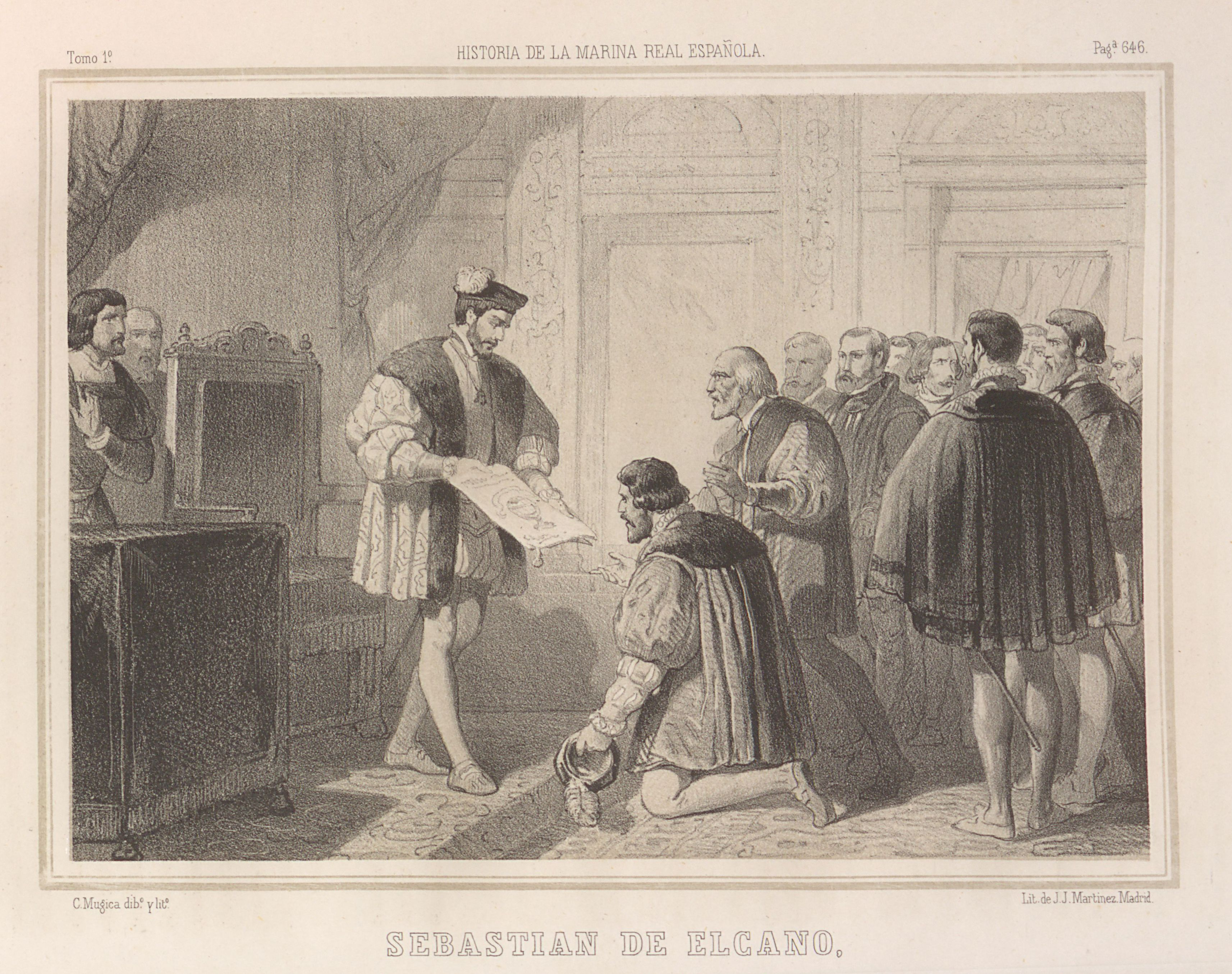
José Ferrer de Couto's engraving

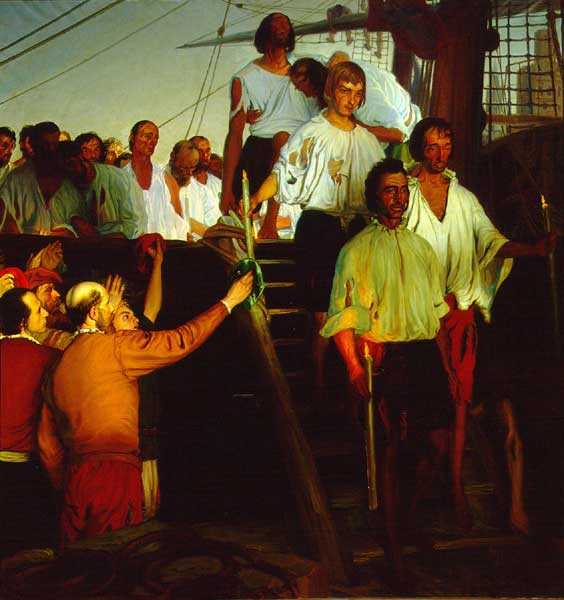
Elkano's gift, by Elías Salaberria, 1924.

=== Banknotes ===
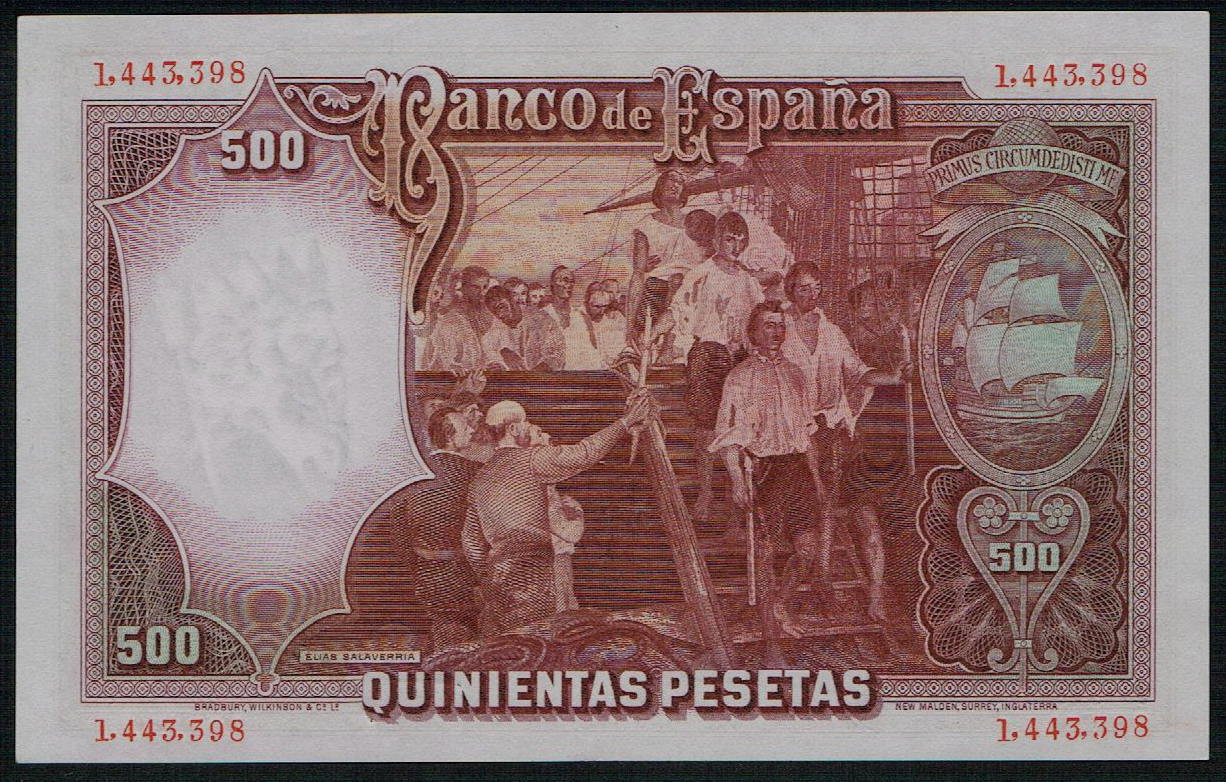
500 peseta, 1931, based on Elias Salaberria's painting

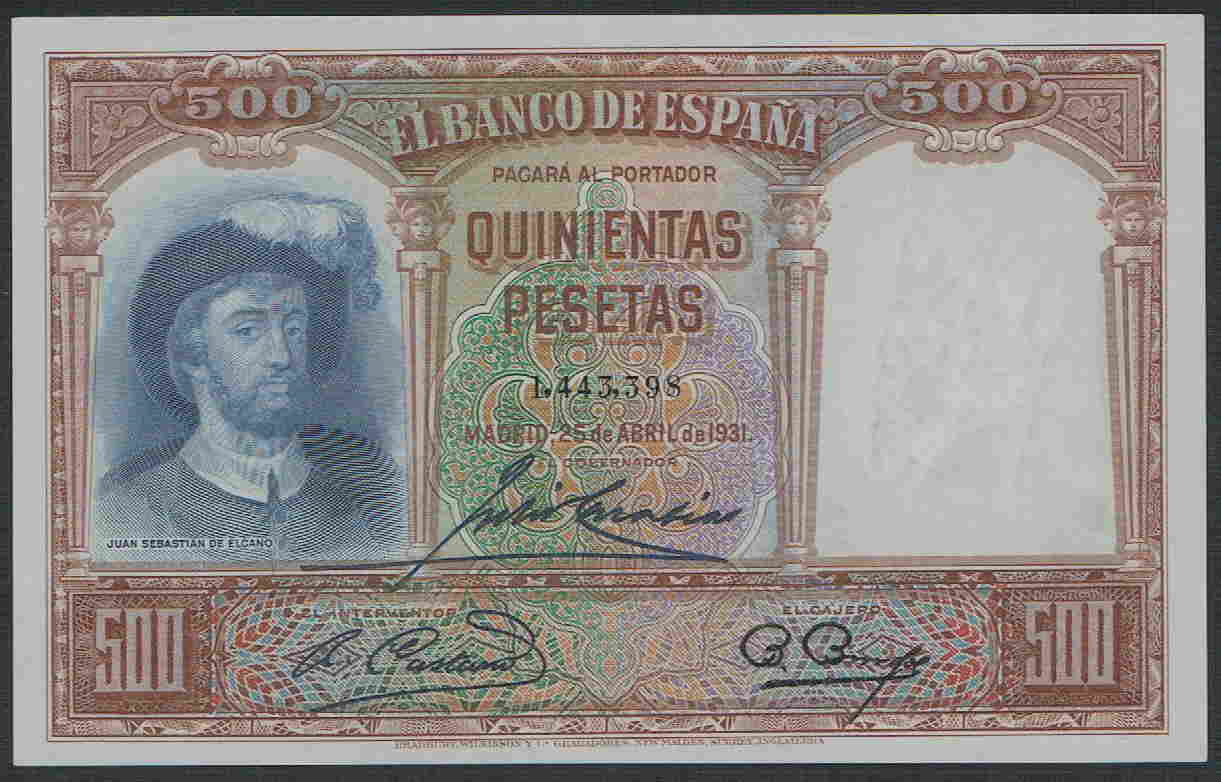
500 peseta, 1931

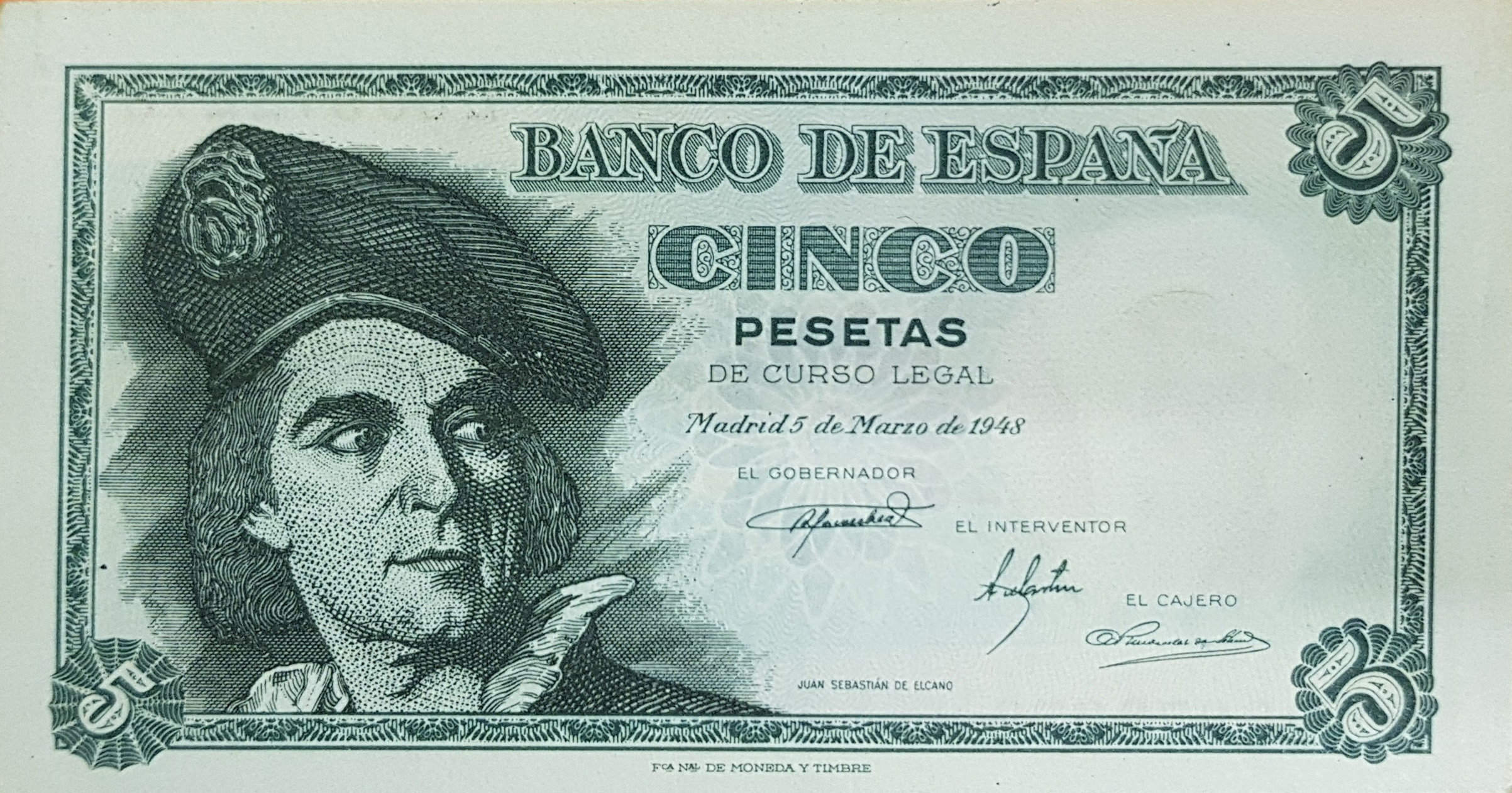
Note of 5 pesetas from 1948, based on Ignacio Zuloaga's painting

=== Sculptures ===
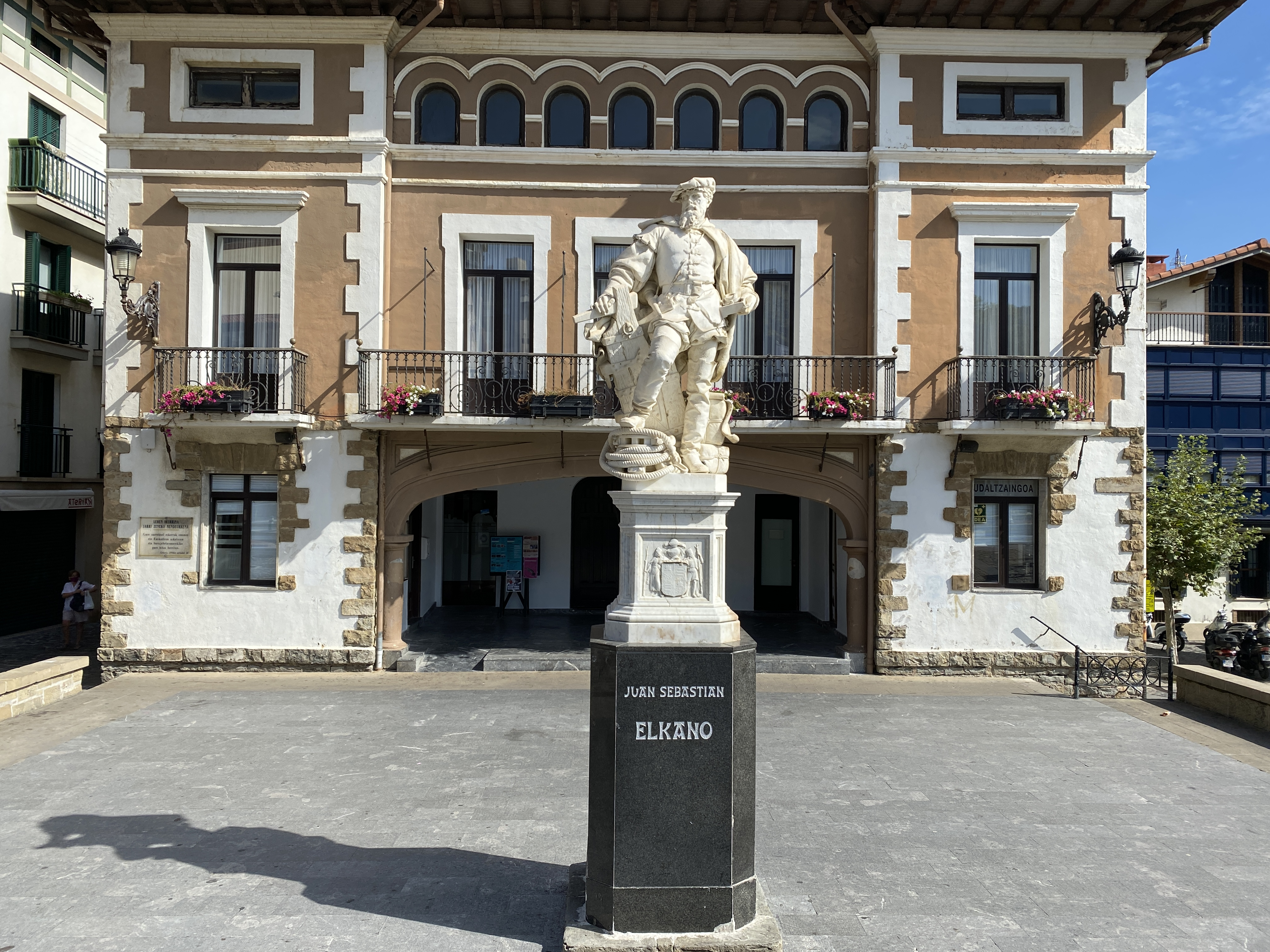
Elcano's statue in Getaria (1881)

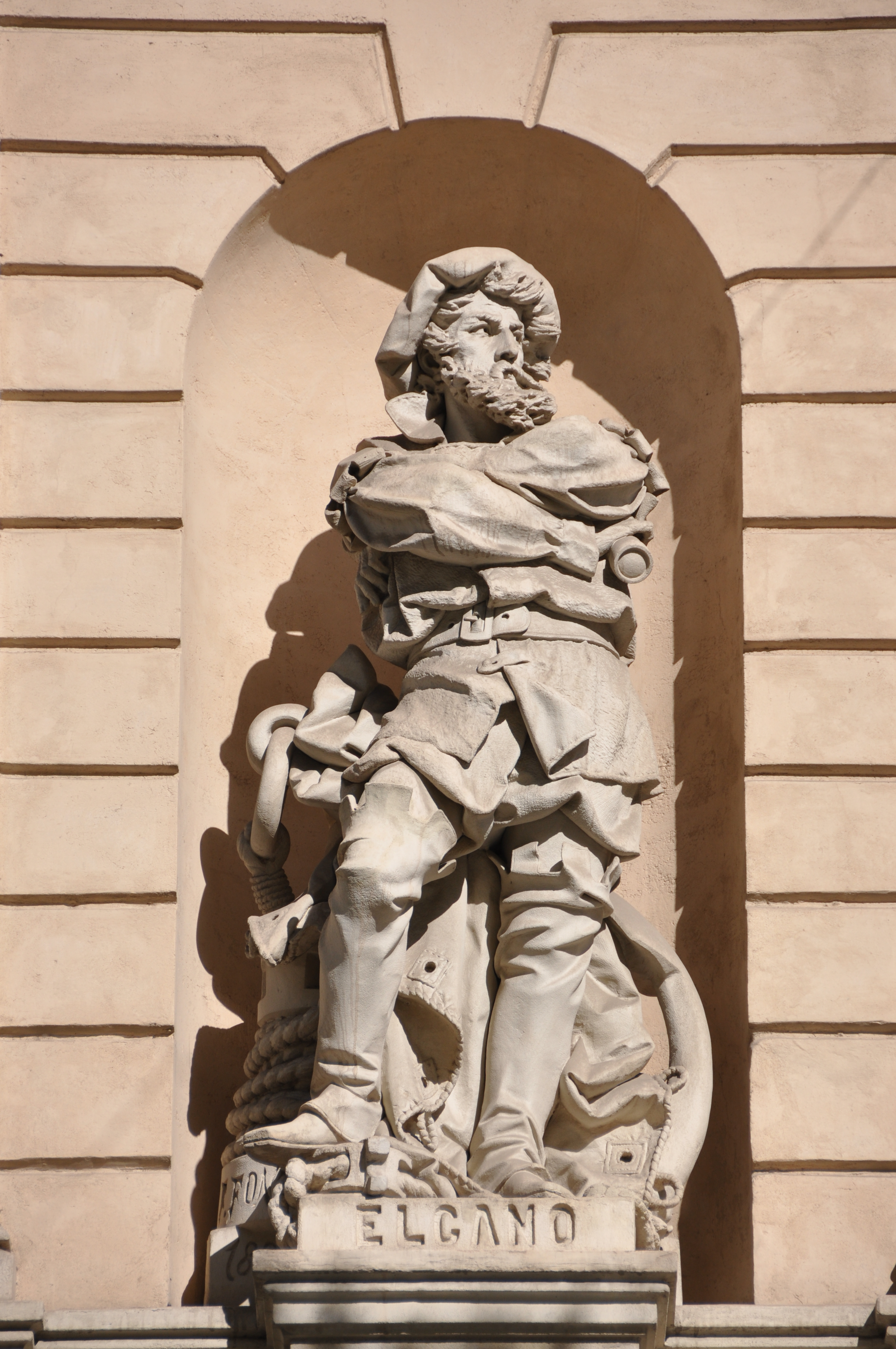
Sculpture at Passeig de Gràcia, Barcelona

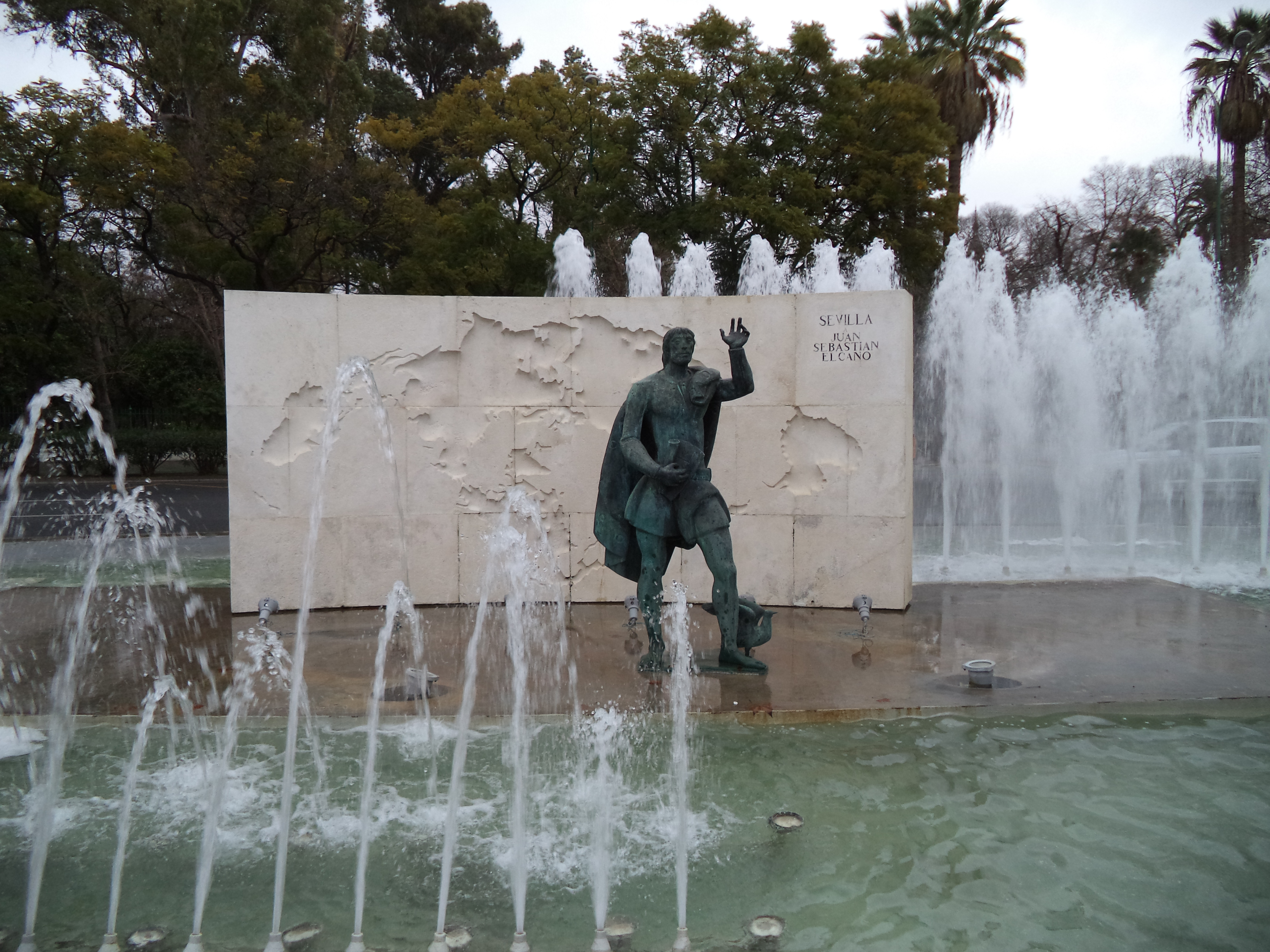
Monument in Seville

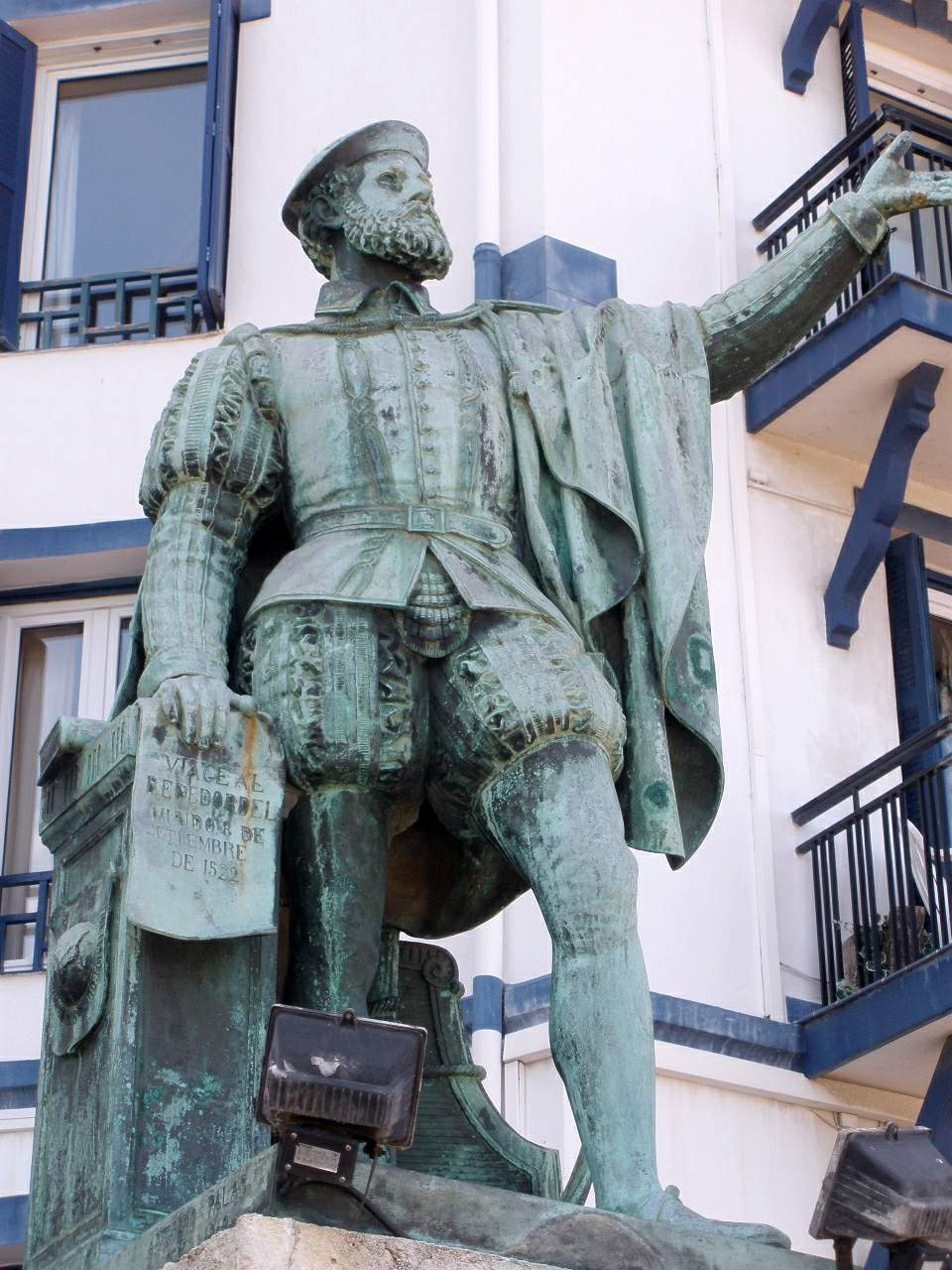
Sculpture by Carlos Palao in Getaria

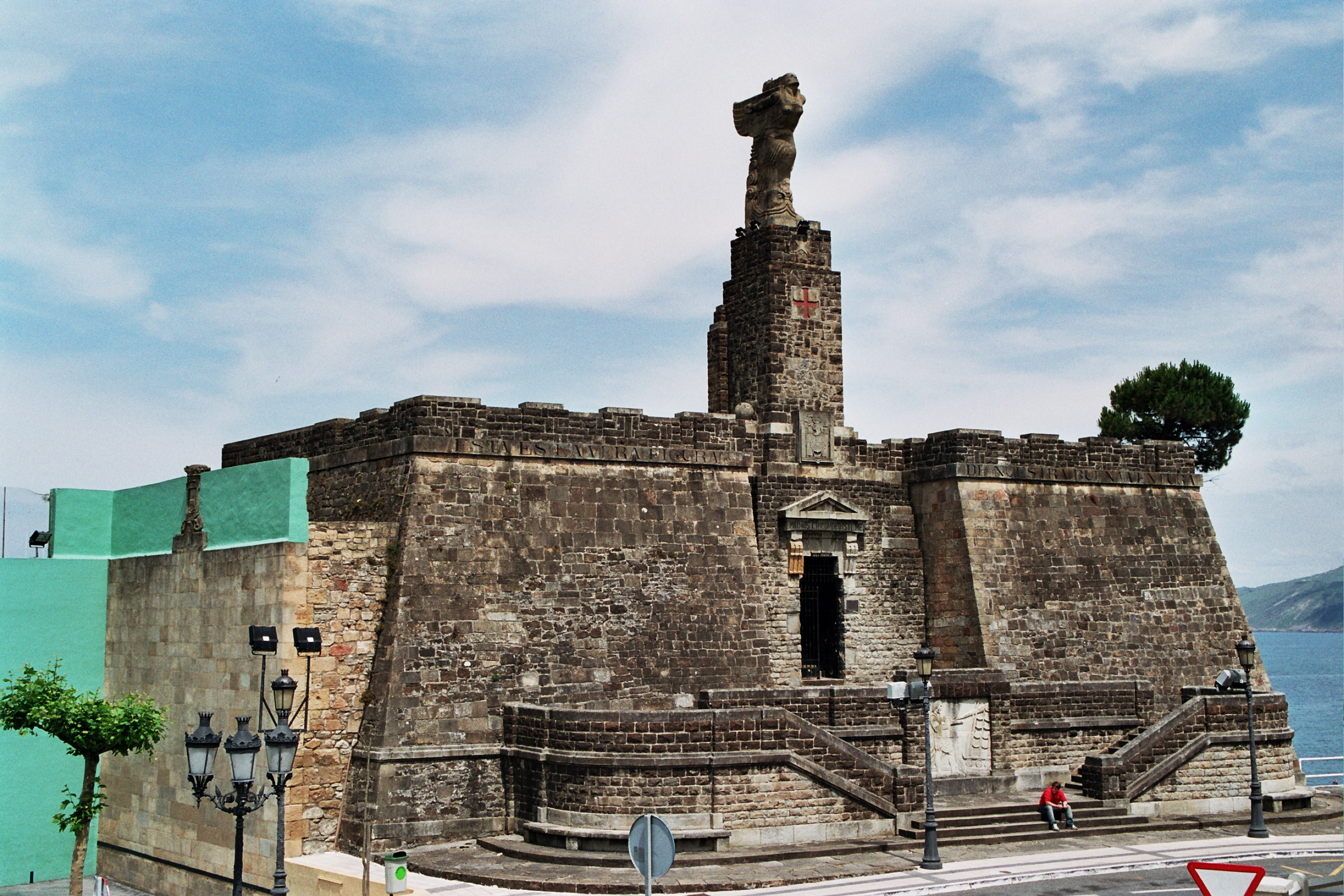
Monument dedicated to Elcano in Getaria

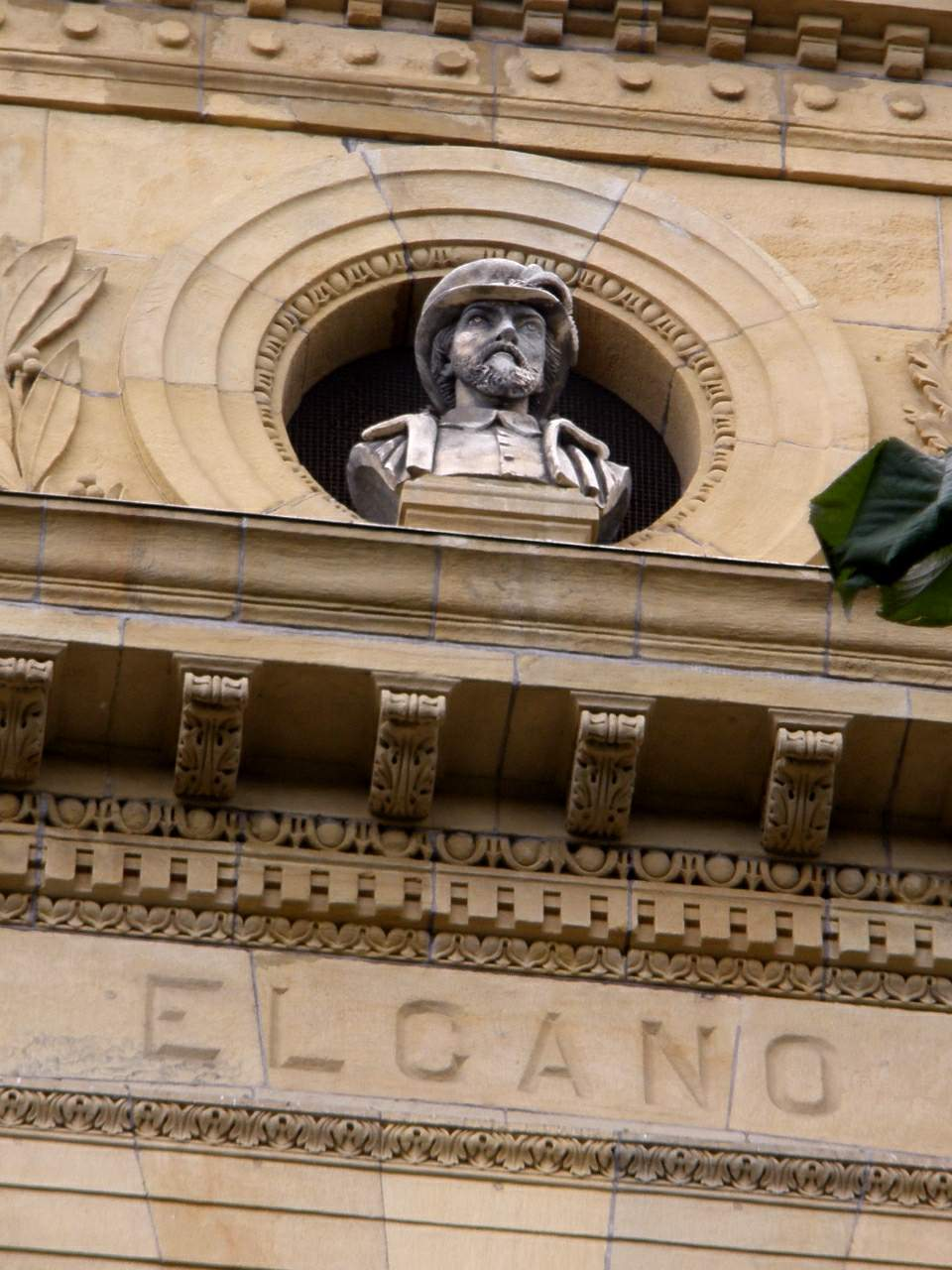
Palace of Gipuzkoa, San Sebastián

=== Cinema ===
In 2019, Elkano, lehen mundu bira, an animated film directed by Ángel Alonso was released in Basque, Spanish, and English. In 2020 another animation movie by Manuel H. Martin called El viaje más largo was presented in Sevilla. In 2022 Amazon Prime broadcast the series Boundless, with Álvaro Morte as Elcano. In 2022 the movie Uncharted mentioned him. The movie is based on his journey with the Magellan Expedition.

== See also ==
- History of the Philippines
- Spanish training ship Juan Sebastián de Elcano
