= Juan Esquivel Barahona =

Spanish church composer (c. 1560 – after 1623)

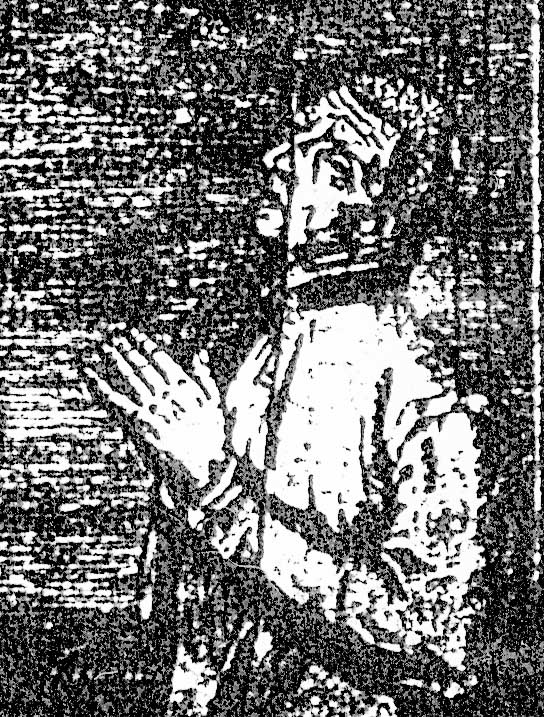
- Presumed portrait of Juan de Esquivel Barahona, 1608
- Born: c. 1560; Ciudad Rodrigo, Salamanca, Spain
- Died: after 1623
- Occupation: Composer
- Years active: 1581–death
- Era: Renaissance

Juan [de] Esquivel Barahona (c. 1560 – after 1623) was the most prominent of the last generation of Spanish church composers of the Renaissance era. Although he never served in one of the major Spanish cathedrals, his music was known throughout Spain during the early seventeenth century.

== Life ==
The surname Esquivel is of Basque origin, but Juan de Esquival was born outside the Basque Country in or near Ciudad Rodrigo, an ancient cathedral city southwest of Salamanca. He began service as a choirboy in the cathedral in 1568 and, according to choir chaplain Antonio Sánchez Cabañas, he was a student of Juan Navarro, the cathedral's choirmaster during Esquivel's youth.

Esquivel's first appointment as maestro de capilla came in 1581, when he was named to the post in Oviedo, the capital of the province of Asturias in Northern Spain. He left that position in 1585 and took a similar position at Calahorra Cathedral in La Rioja. In 1591, he returned to Ciudad Rodrigo as choirmaster, where he remained until his death.

== Music ==
Esquivel composed only sacred music. His output survives in three publications, printed in Salamanca during the early seventeenth century; a fourth book (Salamanca, 1623) of motets and instrumental music was reported by Sanchez-Cabañas in his manuscript history of Ciudad Rodrigo, but no copies of this have been found. Since he began his career during a time when Spanish churches were adopting the Roman liturgy as prescribed by the Council of Trent, his music reveals an attempt to reconcile Spanish polyphonic traditions of the sixteenth century with Tridentine preferences for clarity of text and brevity of statement. This is especially true in his motets, which are among the shortest in the repertoire.

His principal influences were Cristóbal de Morales and Francisco Guerrero, although some influence of his teacher, Navarro is sometimes evident. Esquivel's appreciation of Guerrero is apparent in his use the older master's motets as sources for parody masses. Esquivel, however, was never reluctant to set a text for which a previous composer had gained some fame.

Esquivel's polyphonic style is characterized by a succinctness in his melodic subjects, an occasional use of noncadential chromaticism and parallel motion between voices. His music has some similarity to Portuguese polyphony of his time.

== Publications ==
- Motecta festorum et dominicarum cum communi sanctorum, IV, V, VI, et VIII vocibus concinnanda (Salamanca, Artus Tabernielis, 1608)
- Missarum Ioannis Esquivelis in alma ecclesia Civitatensi portionarii, et cantorum praefecti, liber primus superiorum permissu, Salmanticæ, ex officina typographica Arti Taberniel Antverpiani, anno a Christo nato M.DC.VIII (Salamanca: Artus Tabernielis, 1608)
- Ioannis, Esquivel, Civitatensis, et eiusdem sanctæ ecclesiæ portionarii, psalmorum, hymnorum, magnificarum et B. Mariæ quatuor antiphonarum de tempore, necnon et missarum tomus secundus (Salamanca: Francisco de Cea Tesa, 1613)
- Lost book of hymns, motets, falsobordone items, and pieces for instruments (Salamanca, 1623)

== Discography ==
Various works have been recorded over the years, for example by Pro Cantione Antiqua in the 1970s as part of a 2-CD Spanish collection entitled El Siglo De Oro. However, a 2019 recording (Hyperion CDA68326) by the British choir De Profundis is claimed by its performers to be the first album to be devoted solely to Esquivel's music: Esquivel: Missa Hortus conclusus, Magnificat & motets. The choir is accompanied by Nicholas Perry (bajón) and directed by Eamonn Dougan. The album features a parody mass based on the motet "Hortus conclusus" by Rodrigo de Ceballos. It was well received by the critics.

== Bibliography ==
- Bruner, G. Edward, DMA: "Editions and Analysis of Five Missa Beata Virgine Maria by the Spanish Composers: Morales, Guerreo, Victoria, Vivanco, and Esquivel." DMA diss., University of Illinois at Urbana-Champaign, 1980. [facsimile: University Microfilms International, Ann Arbor, MI, US]
- O'Connor, Michael B. "The Polyphonic Compositions on Marian Texts by Juan de Esquivel Barahona: A Study of Institutional Marian Devotion in Late Renaissance Spain." Ph.D. diss., The Florida State University, 2006. [FSU Electronic dissertations link] https://web.archive.org/web/20120521202201/http://etd.lib.fsu.edu/theses/available/etd-08282006-160857/
- Pure Gold: Golden Age Sacred Music in the Iberian World. A Homage to Bruno Turner. Edited by Tess Knighton and Bernadette Nelson. Kassel: Edition Reichenberger, 2011. ISBN 978-3-937734-88-0 88
- Rodilla León, Francisco: “Nuevos datos sobre la capilla musical de la catedral de Calahorra a finales del siglo XVI. El magisterio de Juan Esquivel de Barahona (1585-1591)”, in Nassarre-Revista Aragonesa de Musicología, Volumen: 26–27, 2004, pp. 403–430.
- Rodilla León, Francisco: El libro de motetes de 1608 de Juan Esquivel de Barahona (c. 1560 – c. 1624): Estudio y transcripción, Centro de Estudios Mirobrigenses - Ayuntamiento de Ciudad Rodrigo, 2005.
- Rodilla León, Francisco: “Estudio, transcripción e interpretación de los motetes de Juan Esquivel de Barahona (c. 1560- c. 1624)”, en Revista de Musicología, Vol.: 28, nº 2, ISSN 0210-1459, Madrid: 2005, pp 1541–1562.
- Rodilla León, Francisco: “Dos libros de polifonía de Juan Esquivel de Barahona: Missarum Ioannis Esquivelis... (1608) y [...] Psalmorum, Hymnorum, Magnificarum... (1613), in Estudios Mirobrigenses (CECEL-CSIC), Vol.: 2, ISSN 1885-057X, Salamanca: 2008, pp. 163–176.
- Rodilla León, Francisco: Juan Esquivel de Barahona in Diccionario Biográfico Español. Available online and in print (Tomo XVII, Madrid: Real Academia de la Historia, 2011, págs. 810–814).
- Rodilla León, Francisco: Medio siglo de esplendor musical en la catedral de Ciudad Rodrigo (1574–1624). Los maestros de capilla Juan Navarro, Alonso de Tejeda y Juan Esquivel. Centro de Estudios Mirobrigenses-Ayto. de Ciudad Rodrigo (Salamanca). Ciudad Rodrigo, 2012.
- Rodilla León, Francisco (estudio y edición): Opera Omnia. Juan Esquivel de Barahona (c. 1560 – c. 1624). I. Officium Defunctorum. Edición de 1613. Ediciones críticas, Editorial Alpuerto, Madrid, 2018.
- Sanchez Cabañas, Antonio. Historia de la M.N.Y.M.L. Ciudad de Ciudad-Rodrigo, comprensiva de su situacion, antigüedad, variedad de poseedores que ha tenido, y otras particularidades dignas de atencion por D. Antonio Sanchez Cabañas, Capellan de número de la Sancta Iglesia Catedral de la misma Ciudad. Mss. 1708–1710. (c. 1626)
- Snow, Robert J. The 1613 Print of Juan Esquivel Barahona. Detroit Monographs in Musicology 7. Detroit: Information Coordinators, 1978.
- Stevenson, Robert M. “Spanish Polyphonists in the Age of the Armada.” Inter-American Music Review 12/2 (1992), 17–114.
- Walkley, Clive. Juan Esquivel: An Unknown Spanish Master Revisited. Early Music 39/1 (February 2001), 76–92. JSTOR 3519090
- Walkley, Clive. Juan Esquivel: A Master of Sacred Music during the Spanish Golden Age. Woodbridge, England: Boydell Press, 2010.
