= Martín de Ayamonte =

Martín de Ayamonte, also called by his Portuguese name Martinho de Aiamonte, was an apprentice seaman in the Magellan–Elcano expedition.

Ayamonte was assigned to Victoria, the nao that rounded the world, receiving the monthly pay of eight hundred (800) maravedis, as revealed in the study of José Toribio Medina, the Chilean historian, who consulted the records of the Casa de Contratacíon de las Indias, operating arm of Spain's Supreme Council of the Indies with headquarters at Seville.

He was a Portuguese registered as a Castilian in the official records of the Magallanes expedition.

== Deserted the Victoria ==
Ayamonte together with a cabin boy, Bartolomé de Saldaña, deserted the Victoria one night on February 5, 1521 as the ship was laid off at the port of Batatara, at the north shore of Timor. They abandoned the Victoria by swimming to the shore.

This incident seems to have given rise to stories of either a mutiny or a brawl among Victoria's crew. Medina cites Gonzalo Fernández de Oviedo as source for the story a number of the men were executed at Timor for participating in a mutiny. On the other hand, Francisco López de Gómara, according to Medina, reported that "many" were killed during a brawl. But Visconde de Lagôa (João A. de Mascarenhas Judice) points to Antonio de Herrera y Tordesillas as source of the brawl story which talks of only a few being killed.

Tim Joyner speculates the reason the two deserted may be because the two were "simply afraid they would not survive another transoceanic voyage."

== Caught and interrogated by the Portuguese ==
Eventually the two were caught by the Portuguese who were the dominant power in those parts of Maritime Southeast Asia. They were both brought to Portuguese Malacca where they were subjected to formal questioning.

The interrogation is recorded in a document of four folios found at the National Archives of Portugal. It is attested to by two Portuguese officials who must have done the questioning, Jorge de Albuquerque and Lopo Cabra Bernardes.

== Account credited as eyewitness record of Ayamonte ==
The document is officially credited as an account by Martinho de Aiamonte which probably meant he was the only one doing the talking during the interrogation.

The eyewitness account was published only in 1933 in Arquivo Histórico de Portugal, vol. I, fasc. 5, 6 under editor António Baião. It was recently republished in modern Portuguese in a book, Fernão de Magalhães, A primeira viagem à volta do mundo contada pelos que nela participaram, edited with notes by Neves Águas: Portugal, 1986.

== Insights into Mazaua island-port ==
Ayamonte's is considered by most Magellan scholars and navigation historians as the least significant of the ten known eyewitness relations. It is in fact largely because it has some references to the port where the Armada anchored from March 28-April 4, 1521 that the account is still worth consideration.

The other eyewitness accounts in this category is by Antonio Pigafetta, Ginés de Mafra, Francisco Albo, and The Genoese Pilot. The most important of these is the one by de Mafra principally because he was able to go back to Mazaua with probably some 90+ companions in March 1543 staying in the port for about six months. De Mafra's observations were precise and measurable. Furthermore, there is the added probability, these were shared by Andrés de San Martín, the chief pilot-astrologer of the fleet, who was some kind of genius in the determination of longitude through mathematical calculation of using conjunctions of the moon with the planets.

Mazaua is the object of a geographical controversy. It is widely believed today as the southern isle of Limasawa. But whereas Mazaua had an excellent harbor, Limasawa has no anchorage. The name "Limasawa" was coined by a Spanish friar, Fr. Francisco Combés, S.J., who had not read a single eyewitness account. What he read was the garbled Italian translation of Pigafetta by Giovanni Battista Ramusio where Mazaua is replaced by Butuan. Combés's other source, the secondary account by Antonio de Herrera y Tordesillas, states the name of the port was "Mazagua" the Hispanicized spelling of "Mazaua"—the gu has the value of w which is absent in the Spanish alphabet.

Ayamonte's name for the port is "Maçava" which is just a different way of spelling "masawa", a word found only in the Butuanon language and its derivative, Tausug, which is a foreign language introduced to Sulu. Cedilla ç in Ayamonte's "Maçava" is an archaic form of s while v is the exact equivalent of w. It is a small help in solving the problem of finding out the true identity of Mazaua, an issue which in the Philippines is framed as the site where the First mass in the Philippines was held.

Here are the exact words of Ayamonte on Mazaua: "...e daly a duzemtas legoas vieram ter a hum arcepeligo de muytas ylhas em que viram muytos paraos e gemte com ouro myto e ysto sõr segundo eu tenho sabydo he a par de Maluco em direito de bamda e nestas ylhas ffizeram sua agoada e dahy vieram ter a huua ylha per nome maçava que era camynho de cimquoenta legoas de huua aa outra e com o Rey da dita ylha ffez o dito Fernam de Magalhaes pazes e daquella jlha o dito Rey della os levou a Cebu outro Rey cujo vasallo elle he." (From "A viagem de Fernão de Magalhães por uma testemunha precencial." In: Arquivo Historico de Portugal by Antonio Baião, Vo.l. 1, fasc. 5, 6, Page 270) This has been translated by British expoloration/navigation historian Raymond John Howgego, a.k.a. Ray Howgego, in this way: "…and two hundred leagues from there they came upon an archipelago of a large number of islands, where they saw many paraus and natives with much gold, and this, sir, as I understand it, is close to Maluco, in the direction of Banda, and in these islands they take water, and from there they came to an island named Massawa, a distance of fifty leagues from one to the other, and with the king of the said island the aforementioned Fernão de Magalhães made peace, and from that island the aforesaid king took them to Cebu, another kingdom to which he is subject."

In most work on Magellan historiography more particularly on Mazaua, virtually nothing is mentioned of Ayamonte. He is first fully accounted for in the research finding of Vicente Calibo de Jesus in a paper read before the Society for the History of Discoveries held on October 13, 2000 at the U.S. Library of Congress, Washington DC, U.S.A. Heretofore, no writing ever related Ayamonte to Mazaua. His abstract is archived at http://www.sochistdisc.org/annual_meetings/annual_2000/annual_meeting_2000_abstracts.htm.

== Final fate unknown ==
Beyond the fact both Ayamonte and Saldaña were interrogated by the Portuguese at Malacca, nothing more is known. Were they ultimately brought back to Europe, to be jailed at Lisbon, as was the general practice at the time? Or did they elect to remain at Malacca?

== Sources ==
- ÁGUAS, Neves. Ed. Fernão de Magalhães, A primeira viagem à volta do mundo contada pelos que nela participaram: Portugal, 1986.
- AYAMONTE, Martín Lopez de. 1523. A viagem de Fernão de Magalhães por uma Presencial. In: Arquivo Histórico de Portugal, vol. I, fasc. 5, 6. Lisbon.
- DE JESUS, Vicente Calibo. 2004. Mazaua, Magellan's Lost Harbor, at
- GOMARA, Francisco Lopez de, Histoire generale des Indes occidentales et terres neuves qui jusques a present ont este descouvertes Paris: 1587)
- HERRERA, Antonio de y Tordesillas. 1601. Historia general de los hechos de los Castellanos en las islas y tierrafirme del mar oceano, t. VI. Angel Gonzalez Palencia (ed.). Madrid 1947.
- JOYNER, Tim. 1992. Magellan. Camden, ME.
- LAGÔA, Visconde de. 1938. Fernão de Magalhãis (A Sua Vida e a Sua Viagem). Lisboa.
- MEDINA, José Toribio. 1890. El descubrimiento de Océano Pacifico: Vasco Nuñez Balboa, Hernando de Magallanes y sus compañeros. Chile, 1920.
- OVIEDO, Gonçalo Fernández y Váldes. 1557. Historia general y natural de las Indias. Valladolid
