= Alonso de Tejeda =

Spanish composer

- Born: 1540
- Origin: Spain
- Died: 1628 (aged 87–88)
- Occupation: Composer

Alonso de Tejeda (1540-1628) was a Spanish composer. He succeeded Alonso Lobo as chapelmaster at Toledo Cathedral in 1605.
