= Names of the British Isles =

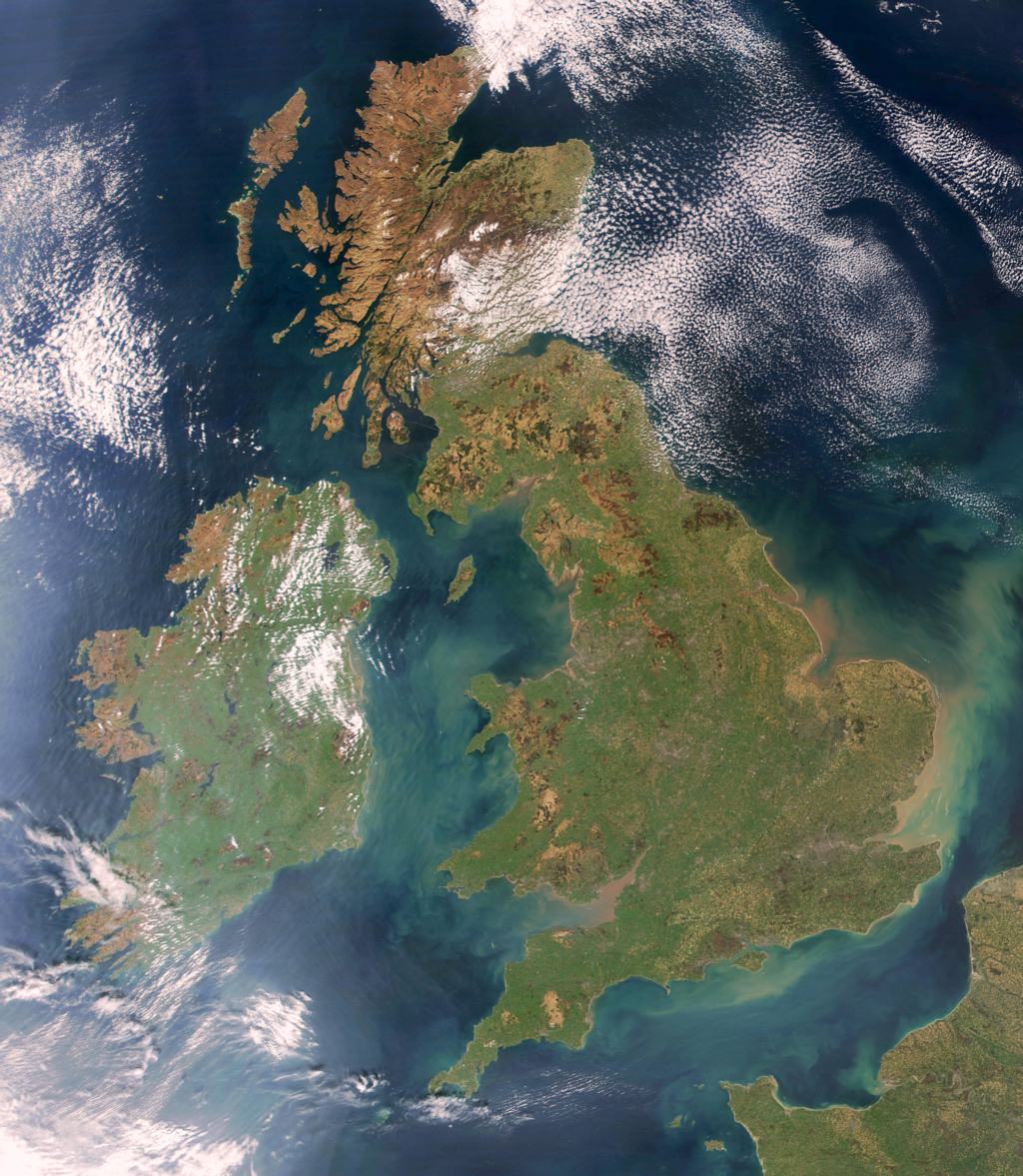
Satellite photo: Ireland is the island on the left and Great Britain is on the right

The toponym "British Isles" refers to a European archipelago comprising Great Britain, Ireland and the smaller, adjacent islands. The word "British" has also become an adjective and demonym referring to the United Kingdom and more historically associated with the British Empire. For this reason, the name British Isles is avoided by some, as such usage could be interpreted to imply continued territorial claims or political overlordship of the Republic of Ireland by the United Kingdom.

Alternative names that are also used for the British Isles include "Britain and Ireland", the "British and Irish Isles", the "Atlantic Archipelago", the "Anglo-Celtic Isles", the "British-Irish Isles", and the Islands of the North Atlantic. In documents drawn up jointly between the British and Irish governments, the archipelago is referred to simply as "these islands".

To some, the reasons to use an alternate name is partly semantic, while, to others, it is a value-laden political one. The Channel Islands are normally included in the British Isles by tradition, even though they are physically a separate archipelago from the rest of the isles. United Kingdom law uses the term British Islands to refer to the UK, Channel Islands, and Isle of Man as a single collective entity.

An early variant of the term British Isles dates back to Ancient Greek times, when they were known as the Pretanic or Britannic Islands. It was translated as the British Isles into English in the late 16th or early 17th centuries by English and Welsh writers. Whilst early works were straightforward translations of Classical geographies into English, later writings have been described as propaganda and politicised.

The term became controversial after the breakup of the United Kingdom of Great Britain and Ireland in 1922. The names of the archipelago's two sovereign states were themselves the subject of a long dispute between the Irish and British governments.

== History ==
=== Classical Antiquity ===
The earliest known names for the islands come from Greco-Roman writings. Sources included the Massaliote Periplus (a merchants' handbook from around 500 BC describing sea routes) and the travel writings of the Greek, Pytheas, from around 320 BC. Although the earliest texts have been lost, excerpts were quoted or paraphrased by later authors. The main islands were called "Ierne", equal to the term Ériu for Ireland, and "Albion" for present-day Great Britain. The island group had long been known collectively as the Pretanic or Britanic isles.

There is considerable confusion about early use of these terms and the extent to which similar terms were used as self-description by the inhabitants. Cognates of these terms are still in use.

According to T. F. O'Rahilly in 1946 "Early Greek geographers style Britain and Ireland 'the Pretanic (or Brettanic) islands', i.e. the islands of the Pritani or Priteni" and that "From this one may reasonably infer that the Priteni were the ruling population of Britain and Ireland at the time when these islands first became known to the Greeks". O'Rahilly identified the Preteni with the Irish: Cruthin and the Latin: Picti, whom he stated were the earliest of the "four groups of Celtic invaders of Ireland" and "after whom these islands were known to the Greeks as 'the Pretanic Islands'". Today O'Rahilly's historical views on the Preteni and the ethnic makeup of early Ireland are no longer accepted by academic archeologists and historians.

According to A. L. F. Rivet and Colin Smith in 1979 "the earliest instance of the name which is textually known to us" is in The Histories of Polybius, who referred to them as: τῶν αἱ Βρεταννικαί νήσοι, romanized: tōn hai Bretannikai nēsoi, lit. 'Brettanic Islands' or 'British Isles'. According to Rivet and Smith, this name encompassed "Britain with Ireland". Polybius wrote:

ἴσως γὰρ δή τινες ἐπιζητήσουσι πῶς πεποιημένοι τὸν πλεῖστον λόγον ὑπὲρ τῶν κατὰ Λιβύην καὶ κατ᾿ Ἰβηρίαν τόπων οὔτε περὶ τοῦ καθ᾿ Ἡρακλέους στήλας στόματος οὐδὲν ἐπὶ πλεῖον εἰρήκαμεν οὔτε περὶ τῆς ἔξω θαλάττης καὶ τῶν ἐν ταύτῃ συμβαινόντων ἰδιωμάτων, οὐδὲ μὴν περὶ τῶν Βρεττανικῶν νήσων καὶ τῆς τοῦ καττιτέρου κατασκευῆς, ἔτι δὲ τῶν ἀργυρείων καὶ χρυσείων τῶν κατ᾿ αὐτὴν Ἰβηρίαν, ὑπὲρ ὧν οἱ συγγραφεῖς ἀμφισβητοῦντες πρὸς ἀλλήλους τὸν πλεῖστον διατίθενται λόγον.
Some readers will perhaps ask themselves why, since most of what I have said relates to Africa and Spain, I have not said a word more about the mouth of the Mediterranean at the Pillars of Hercules, or about the Outer Sea and its peculiarities, or about the British Isles and the method of obtaining tin, and the gold and silver mines in Spain itself, all matters concerning which authors dispute with each other at great length.

— Polybius, Histories, III.57.2–3.

According to Christopher Snyder in 2003, the collective name "Brittanic Isles" (Greek: αἱ Βρεττανίαι, romanized: hai Brettaníai, lit. 'the Britains') was "a geographic rather than a cultural or political designation" including Ireland. According to Snyder, "Preteni", a word related to the Latin: Britanni, lit. 'Britons' and to the Welsh: Prydein, lit. 'Britain', was used by southern Britons to refer to the people north of the Antonine Wall, also known as the Picts (Latin: Picti, lit. 'painted ones'). According to Snyder, "Preteni" was a probably from a Celtic term meaning "people of the forms", whereas the Latin name Picti was probably derived from the Celtic practice of tattooing or painting the body before battle. According to Kenneth H. Jackson, the Pictish language was a Celtic language related to modern Welsh and to ancient Gaulish with influences from earlier non-Indo-European languages.

The fourth chapter of the first book of the Bibliotheca historica of Diodorus Siculus describes Julius Caesar as having "advanced the Roman Empire as far as the British Isles" (Greek: προεβίβασε δὲ τὴν ἡγεμονίαν τῆς Ῥώμης μέχρι τῶν Βρεττανικῶν νήσων, romanized: proebíbase dè tḕn hēgemonían tês Rhṓmēs mékhri tôn Brettanikôn nḗsōn) and in the 38th chapter of the third book Diodorus remarks that the region "about the British Isles" (τὸ περὶ τὰς Βρεττανικὰς νήσους, tò perì tàs Brettanikàs nḗsous) and other distant lands of the oecumene "have by no means come to be included in the common knowledge of men". According to Philip Freeman in 2001, "it seems reasonable, especially at this early point in classical knowledge of the Irish, for Diodorus or his sources to think of all inhabitants of the Brettanic Isles as Brettanoi".

According to Barry Cunliffe in 2002, "The earliest reasonably comprehensive description of the British Isles to survive from the classical authors is the account given by the Greek writer Diodorus Siculus in the first century B.C. Diodorus uses the word Pretannia, which is probably the earliest Greek form of the name". Cunliffe argued that "the original inhabitants would probably have called themselves Pretani or Preteni", citing Jackson's argument that the form Pretani was used in the south of Britain and the form Preteni was used in the north. This form then remained in use in the Roman period to describe the Picts beyond the Antonine Wall. In Ireland, where Qu took the place of P, the form Quriteni was used. Cunliffe argued that "Since it is highly probable that Diodorus was basing his description on a text of Pytheas's (though he nowhere acknowledges the fact), it would most likely have been Pytheas who first transliterated the local word for the islands into the Greek Prettanikē. Pytheas may have taken his name for the inhabitants from the name Pretani when he made landfall on the peninsula of Belerion, though in Cunliffe's view, because it is unusual for a self-description (an endonym) to describe appearance, this name may have been used by Armoricans, from whom Pytheas would have learnt what the inhabitants of Albion were called. According to Snyder, the Greek: Πρεττανοί, romanized: Prettanoí derives from "a Gallo-Brittonic word which may have been introduced to Britain during the P-Celtic linguistic innovations of the sixth century BC".

According to Cunliffe, Diodorus Siculus used the spelling Prettanía, while Strabo used both Brettanía and Prettanía. Cunliffe argues the B spelling appears only in the first book of Strabo's Geography, so the P spelling reflects Strabo's original spelling and the changes to Book I are the result of a scribal error. According to Stefan Radt's 2006 commentary to his critical edition however, although the medieval manuscripts of Strabo's Geography vary in the spelling, the older epitome, which is often the only witness to preserve the correct reading, consistently uses the B spelling. According to Radt, "Where it is missing, one may confidently adopt the B found in secondary manuscripts, assuming it was also present in the Strabo text underlying the epitome" (German: wo sie fehlt kann man daher ohne Bedenken das B-sekundärer Handschriften aufnehmen, da man davon ausgehen darf dass es auch in dem der Epitome zugrundeliegenden Strabontext gestanden hat).

In classical texts, the word Britain (Greek: Pρεττανία, romanized: Prettanía or Bρεττανία, Brettanía; Latin: Britannia) replaced the word Albion. An inhabitant was therefore called a "Briton" (Bρεττανός, Brettanós; Britannus), with the adjective becoming "British" (Bρεττανικός, Brettanikós; Britannicus).

The Pseudo-Aristotelian text On the Universe (Ancient Greek: Περὶ Κόσμου, romanized: Perì Kósmou; Latin: De Mundo) mentions the British Isles, identifying the two largest islands, Albion (Ἀλβίων, Albíōn) and Ireland (Ἰέρνη, Iérnē), and stating that they are "called British" (Βρεττανικαὶ λεγόμεναι, Brettanikaì legómenai) when describing the ocean beyond the Mediterranean Basin:

ἐν τούτῳ γε μὴν νῆσοι μέγισται τυγχάνουσιν οὖσαι δύο, Βρεττανικαὶ λεγόμεναι, Ἀλβίων καὶ Ἰέρνη, τῶν προϊστορημένων μείζους, ὑπὲρ τοὺς Κελτοὺς κείμεναι.
There are two very large islands in it, called the British Isles, Albion and Ierne; they are larger than those already mentioned, and lie beyond the land of the Celts.

— Pseudo-Aristotle, On the Universe, 393b.

Apuleius's Latin adaptation of the Aristotelian De Mundo calls the British Isles "the two Britains" (Britanniae duae), naming Albion (Labeon) and Ireland (Hibernia):

Sed in altera parte orbis iacent insularum aggeres maximarum, Britanniae duae, et Labeon et Hibernia, <eis> quas supra diximus [esse] maiores. Verum hae in Celtarum finibus sitae.
In another part of [our] region lie the land-masses of the largest islands: these are the two British isles, Albion and Hibernia, both larger than those we mentioned before. These, in fact, are situated on the borders of the Celtic lands; …

— Apuleius, On the Universe, VII.1.

According to Philip Freeman in 2001, "The Latin version is a close translation of the Greek and adds no new information".

Strabo, in his Geographica, refers to the British Isles as "the Britains" (Βρεττανίδες, Brettanídes), citing Pytheas for his information on Britain (Βρεττανική, Brettanikḗ), Ireland (Ἰέρνη, Iérnē), and Thule (Θούλη, Thoúlē). According to D. Graham J. Shipley, "Strabo probably consulted Pytheas' work only indirectly through other authors". Strabo was disapproving of Pytheas, whose work was used by Strabo's predecessor Eratosthenes. Strabo wrote:

ὁ μὲν οὖν Μασσαλιώτης Πυθέας τὰ περὶ Θούλην τὴν βορειοτάτην τῶν Βρεττανίδων ὕστατα λέγει, παρ’ οἷς ὁ αὐτός ἐστι τῷ ἀρκτικῷ ὁ θερινὸς τροπικὸς κύκλος. παρὰ δὲ τῶν ἄλλων οὐδὲν ἱστορῶ, οὔθ’ ὅτι Θούλη νῆσός ἐστί τις οὔτ’ εἰ τὰ μέχρι δεῦρο οἰκήσιμά ἐστιν, ὅπου ὁ θερινὸς τροπικὸς ἀρκτικὸς γίνεται. νομίζω δὲ πολὺ εἶναι νοτιώτερον τοῦτου τὸ τῆς οἰκουμένης πέρας τὸ προσάρκτιον· οἱ γὰρ νῦν ἱστοροῦντες περαιτέρω τῆς Ἰέρνης οὐδὲν ἔχουσι λέγειν, ἣ πρὸς ἄρκτον πρόκειται τῆς Βρεττανικῆς πλησίον, ἀγρίων τελέως ἀνθρώπων καὶ κακῶς οἰκούντων διὰ ψῦχος· ὥστ’ ἐνταῦθα νομίζω τὸ πέρας εἶναι θετέον.
Now Pytheas of Massalia says that the region around Thoule, the most northerly of the Brettanides (British Isles), is the farthest, and that the circle of the summer tropic is the same as the arctic circle. I have learned nothing about this from anyone else: whether there is a certain island called Thoule, or whether there is habitation up to where the summer tropic becomes the arctic. I believe that the northern boundary of the inhabited world is much further to the south. Nothing is described beyond Ierne, which lies to the north of Brettanike and near to it, where men are totally wild and live badly because of the cold, and thus I believe that the boundary is to be placed there.

— Strabo, Geographica, II.3.8.

Around AD 70, Pliny the Elder, in Book 4 of his Naturalis Historia, describes the islands he considers to be "Britanniae" as including Great Britain, Ireland, Orkney, smaller islands such as the Hebrides, the Isle of Man, Anglesey, possibly one of the Frisian Islands, and islands which have been identified as Ushant and Sian. He refers to Great Britain as the island called "Britannia", noting that its former name was "Albion". The list also includes the island of Thule, most often identified as Iceland—although some express the view that it may have been the Faroe Islands—the coast of Norway or Denmark, or possibly Shetland. After describing the Rhine delta, Pliny begins his chapter on the British Isles, which he calls "the Britains" (Britanniae):

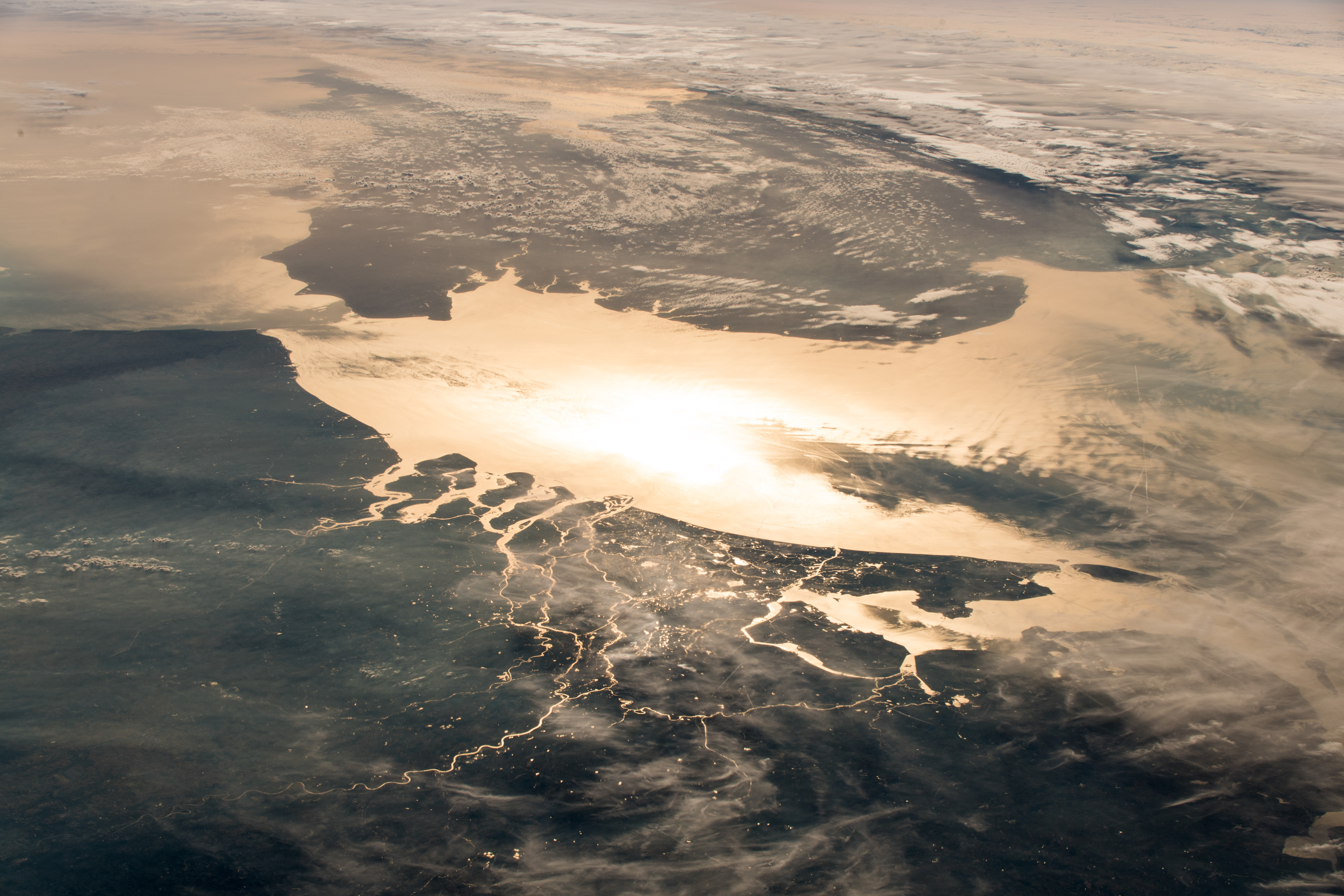
Great Britain opposite the Rhine–Meuse–Scheldt delta, photographed from across the North Sea by the astronaut Alexander Gerst.

Ex adverso huius situs Britannia insula clara Graecis nostrisque monimentis inter septentrionem et occidentem iacet, Germaniae, Galliae, Hispaniae, multo maximis Europae partibus magno intervallo adversa. Albion ipsi nomen fuit, cum Britanniae vocarentur omnes de quibus mox paulo dicemus.
Opposite to this region lies the island of Britain, famous in the Greek records and in our own; it lies to the north-west, facing, across a wide channel, Germany, Gaul and Spain, countries which constitute by far the greater part of Europe. It was itself named Albion, while all the islands about which we shall soon briefly speak were called the Britains.

— Pliny the Elder, Natural History, IV.16.

According to Thomas O'Loughlin in 2018, the British Isles was "a concept already present in the minds of those living in continental Europe since at least the 2nd–cent. CE".

In his Orbis descriptio, Dionysius Periegetes mentions the British Isles and describes their position opposite the Rhine delta, specifying that there are two islands and calling them the "Bretanides" (Βρετανίδες, Bretanídes or Βρεταννίδες, Bretannídes).

… αὐτὰρ ὑπ' ἄκρην
Ἱρήν, ἣν ἐνέπουσι κάρην ἔμεν Εὐρωπείης,
νήσους Ἑσπερίδας, τόθι κασσιτέροιο γενέθλη,
ἀφνειοὶ ναίουσιν ἀγαυῶν παῖδες Ἰβήρων.
ἄλλαι δ' Ὠκεανοῖο παραὶ βορεώτιδας ἀκτὰς
δισσαὶ νῆσοι ἔασι Βρετανίδες, ἀντία Ῥήνου·
κεῖθι γὰρ ὑστατίην ἀπερεύγεται εἰς ἅλα δίνην.
τάων τοι μέγεθος περιώσιον οὐ κέ τις ἄλλη
νήσοις ἐν πάσῃσι Βρετανίσιν ἰσοφαρίζοι.

… beneath
The Sacred Cape (head, so they say, of Europe)
Are the Hesperides isles, birthplace of tin,
Home to the noble Iberes' sons.
By the ocean's northern fringes, other isles—
The twin Bretanides—face the Rhine's mouth,
For its last eddies issue in that sea.
Enormous is their size: of all the isles
None could with the Bretanides contend.

— Dionysius Periegetes, Orbis descriptio, lines 561–569.

In Priscian's Latin adaptation of Dionysius's Greek Orbis descriptio, the British Isles are mentioned as "the twin Britannides" (… geminae … Britannides).

In his Ars tactica, Arrian referred to "people living in the islands called "Britannic" which belong to the Great Exterior sea" (οἱ ἐν ταῖς νήσοις ταῖς Βρεττανικαῖς καλουμέναις τῆς ἔξω τῆς μεγάλης θαλάσσης, hoi en taîs nḗsois taîs Brettanikaîs kalouménais tês éxō tês megálēs thalássēs) as being the only people in the world still to use war chariots.

In his Almagest (147–148 AD), Claudius Ptolemy referred to the larger island as Great Britain (Greek: Μεγάλη Βρεττανία, romanized: Megálē Brettanía) and to Ireland as Little Britain (Greek: Μικρά Βρεττανία, romanized: Mikrá Brettanía). According to Philip Freeman in 2001, Ptolemy "is the only ancient writer to use the name "Little Britain" for Ireland, though in doing so he is well within the tradition of earlier authors who pair a smaller Ireland with a larger Britain as the two Brettanic Isles". In the second book of Ptolemy's Geography (c. 150 AD), the second and third chapters are respectively titled in Greek: Κεφ. βʹ Ἰουερνίας νήσου Βρεττανικῆς θέσις, romanized: Iouernías nḗsou Brettanikê̄s thésis, lit. 'Ch. 2, position of Hibernia, a British island' and Κεφ. γʹ Ἀλβουίωνος νήσου Βρεττανικῆς θέσις, Albouíōnos nḗsou Brettanikê̄s thésis, 'Ch. 3, position of Albion, a British island'.

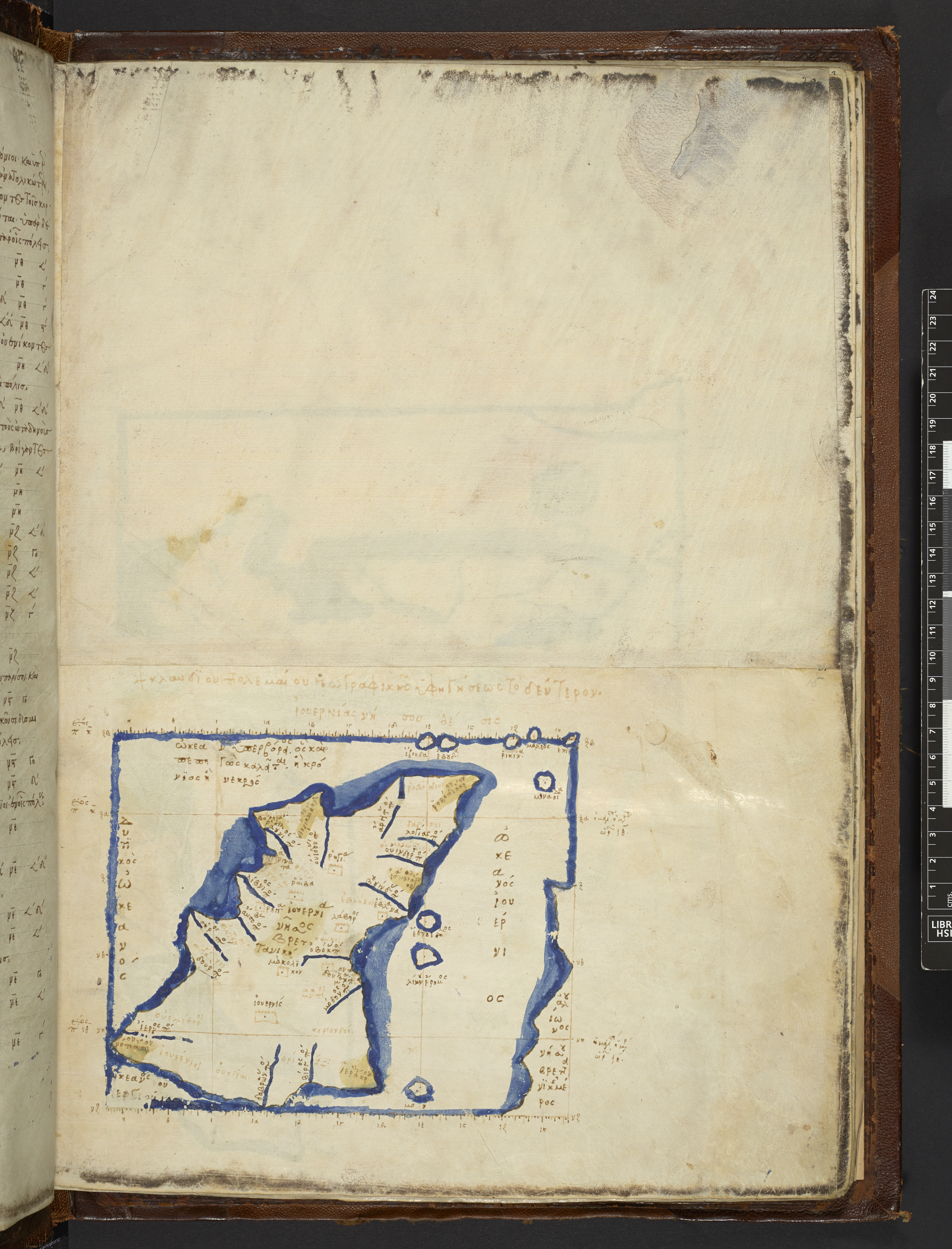
The westernmost portion of Ptolemy's "first European map" from a Greek manuscript edition of Geography, dated c. 1400, once owned by Charles Burney and now in the British Library, depicting Ireland. The island is labelled in Ancient Greek: Ἰουερνία νῆσος Βρεττανική, romanized: Iouernía nê̄sos Brettanikḗ, lit. 'Hibernia, British island'.

In the fifth chapter of the seventh book of Geography, Ptolemy describes the British Isles as being at the northern limits of the oecumene: "in the north, the oecumene is limited by the continuation of the ocean which surrounds the British Isles and the northernmost parts of Europe" (ἀπ’ ἄρκτων δὲ τῷ συνημμένῳ Ὠκεανῷ, τῷ περιέχοντι τὰς Βρεττανικὰς νήσους καὶ τὰ βορειότατα τῆς Εὐρώπης, ap’ árktōn dè tôi sunēmménōi Ōkeanôi, tôi periékhonti tàs Brettanikàs nḗsous kaì tà boreiótata tês Eurṓpēs). In the same chapter, he enumerates in order of size the ten largest islands or peninsulas known to him, listing both Great Britain and Ireland:

Τῶν δὲ ἀξιολογωτέρων νήσων ἢ χερσονήσων πρώτη μὲν Ταπροβάνη, δευτέρα δὲ τῶν Βρεττανικῶν ἡ Ἀλουίωνος, τρίτη δὲ ἡ Χρυσῆ Χερσόνησος, τετάρτη δὲ τῶν Βρεττανικῶν ἡ Ἰουερνία, πέμπτη δὲ ἡ Πελοπόννησος, ἕκτη δὲ ἡ Σικελία, ἑβδόμη δὲ ἡ Σαρδώ, ὀγδόη δὲ ἡ Κύρνος, ἐνάτη δὲ ἡ Κρήτη, δεκάτη δὲ ἡ Κύπρος.
Of the more notable islands or peninsulas, Taprobane is the first in terms of size, Albion – one of the British Isles – the second, the Golden Chersonese is the third, Hibernia – another British isle – the fourth, the Peloponnese the fifth, Sicily the sixth, Sardinia the seventh, Corsica the eighth, Crete the ninth, Cyprus the tenth.

— Claudius Ptolemy, Geographia, VII.5.11.

In the third chapter of the eighth book of Geography, Ptolemy summarizes the content of his maps, stating that "The first map of Europe includes the British Isles and the surrounding islands" (Ὁ πρῶτος πίναξ τῆς Εὐρώπης περιέχει τὰς Βρεττανικὰς νήσους σὺν ταῖς περὶ αὐτὰς νήσοις, Ho prôtos pínax tês Eurṓpēs periékhei tàs Brettanikàs nḗsous sùn taîs perì autàs nḗsois).

Ptolemy wrote around AD 150, although he used the now-lost work of Marinus of Tyre from about fifty years earlier. Ptolemy included Thule in the chapter on Albion; the coordinates he gives correlate with the location of Shetland, though the location given for Thule by Pytheas may have been further north, in Iceland or Norway. Geography generally reflects the situation c. 100 AD.

Following the conquest of AD 43 the Roman province of Britannia was established, and Roman Britain expanded to cover much of the island of Great Britain. An invasion of Ireland was considered but never undertaken, and Ireland remained outside the Roman Empire. The Romans failed to consolidate their hold on the Scottish Highlands; the northern extent of the area under their control (defined by the Antonine Wall across central Scotland) stabilised at Hadrian's Wall across the north of England by about AD 210. Inhabitants of the province continued to refer to themselves as "Brittannus" or "Britto", and gave their patria (homeland) as "Britannia" or as their tribe. The vernacular term "Priteni" came to be used for the barbarians north of the Antonine Wall, with the Romans using the tribal name "Caledonii" more generally for these peoples who (after AD 300) they called Picts.

The post-conquest Romans used Britannia or Britannia Magna (Large Britain) for Britain, and Hibernia or Britannia Parva (Small Britain) for Ireland. The post-Roman era saw Brythonic kingdoms established in all areas of Great Britain except the Scottish Highlands, but coming under increasing attacks from Picts, Scotti and Anglo-Saxons. At this time Ireland was dominated by the Gaels and/or Scotti, who subsequently gave their names to Ireland and Scotland, which were sometimes known as Scotia Major and Scotia Minor respectively.

In the grammatical treatise he dedicated to the emperor Marcus Aurelius (r. 161–180), De prosodia catholica, Aelius Herodianus notes the differences in spelling of the name of the British Isles, citing Ptolemy as one of the authorities who spelt the name with a pi (Ancient Greek: π, romanized: p): "Brettanídes islands in the Ocean; and some [spell] like this with pi, Pretanídes, such as Ptolemy" (Βρεττανίδες νῆσοι ἐν τῷ Ὠκεανῷ· καὶ ἄλλοι οὕτως διὰ τοῦ π Πρετανίδες νῆσοι, ὡς Πτολεμαῖος, Brettanídes nêsoi en tôi Ōkeanôi; kaì álloi hoútōs dià toû p Pretanídes nêsoi, hōs Ptolemaîos). Herodianus repeated this information in De orthographia: "Brettanídes islands in the ocean. They are called with pi, Pretanídes, such as by Ptolemy" (Βρεττανίδες νῆσοι ἐν τῷ ὠκεανῷ. λέγονται καὶ διὰ τοῦ π Πρετανίδες ὡς Πτολεμαῖος, Brettanides nēsoi en tō ōkeanōi. legontai kai dia tou p Pretanides hōs Ptolemaios).

The chronicle attributed to Pope Hippolytus of Rome mentions the British Isles as part of the lands allotted to Japheth in the table of nations:

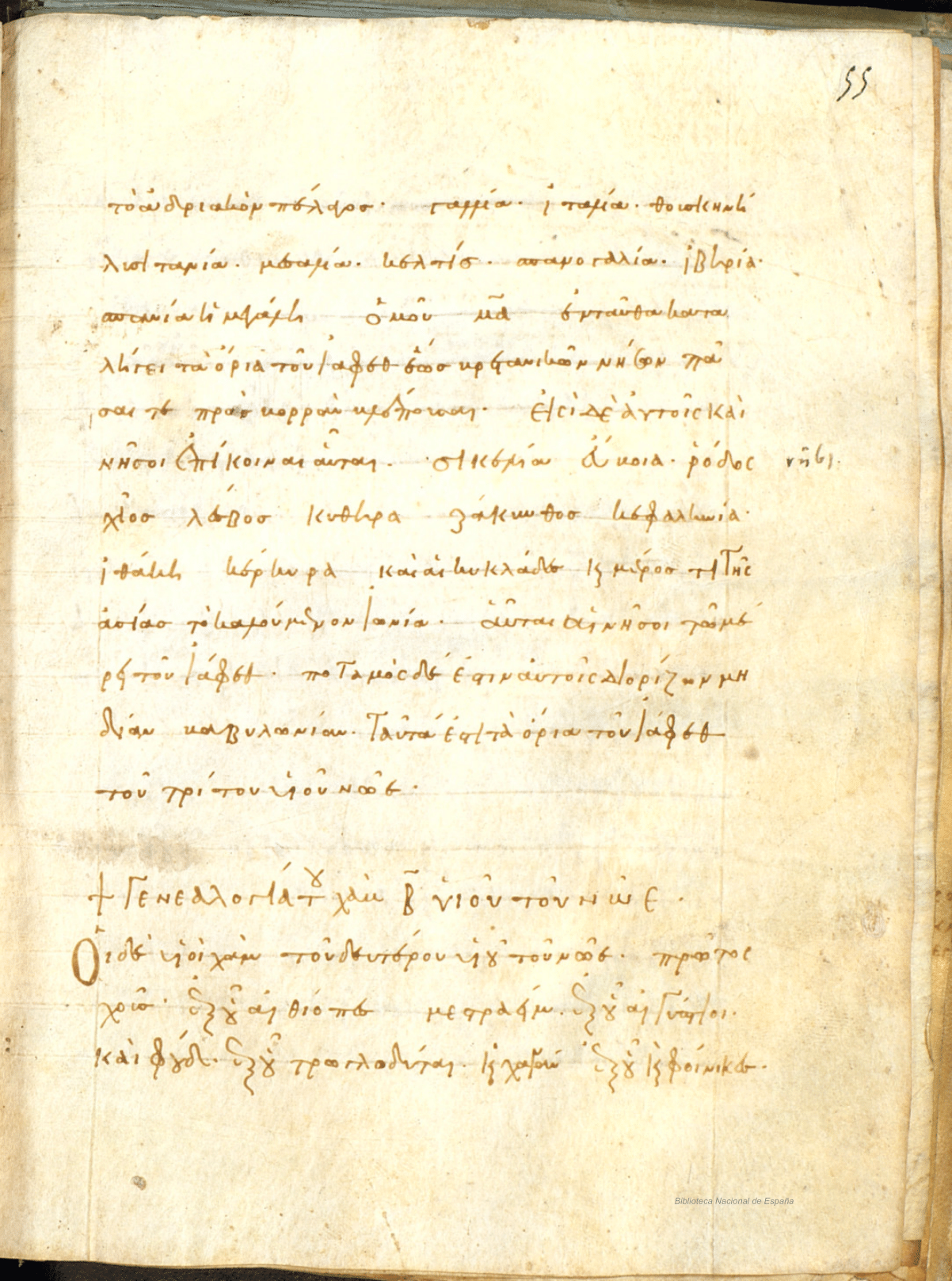
Folio 55 recto of the Biblioteca Nacional de España's Greek manuscript 4701 (formerly 121), probably copied in the second half of the 10th century and including the phrase ἕως Βρεταννικῶν νήσων, héōs Bretannikôn nḗsōn, 'as far as the British Isles'.

ἐνταῦθα καταλήγει τὰ ὅρια τοῦ Ἰάφεθ ἕως Βρεταννικῶν νήσων πᾶσαί τε πρὸς βορρᾶν βλέπουσαι.
There end the boundaries of Japheth as far as the British Islands, and all looking towards the north.

— Hippolytus of Rome, Chronicon, 86.

In the manuscript tradition of the Sibylline Oracles, two lines from the fifth book may refer to the British Isles:

ἔσσεται ἐν Βρύτεσσι καὶ ἐν Γάλλοις πολυχρύσοις
ὠκεανὸς κελαδῶν πληρούμενος αἵματι πολλῷ·

— Sibylline Oracles, Book V.

In the editio princeps of this part of the Sibylline Oracles, published by Sixt Birck in 1545, the Ancient Greek: Βρύτεσσι, romanized: Brýtessi or Brútessi is printed as in the manuscripts. In the Latin translation by Sebastian Castellio published alongside Birck's Greek text in 1555, these lines are translated as:

In Gallis auro locupletibus, atque Britannis,
Oceanus multo resonabit sanguine plenus:

— Sibylline Oracles, Book V.

Castellio translated Βρύτεσσι as Latin: Britannis, lit. 'the Britains' or 'the British Isles'. The chronicler John Stow in 1580 cited the spelling of Βρύτεσσι in the Sibylline Oracles as evidence that the British Isles had been named after Brutus of Troy. William Camden quoted these Greek and Latin texts in his Britannia, published in Latin in 1586 and in English in 1610, following Castelio's translation identifying Βρύτεσσι with the Britains or Britons:

Twixt Brits and Gaules their neighbours rich, in gold that much abound,
The roaring Ocean Sea with bloud full filled shall resound.

— William Camden, Britannia, 1610.

In Aloisius Rzach's 1891 critical edition, the manuscript reading of Βρύτεσσι is retained. Rzach suggested that Procopius of Caesarea referred to these lines when mentioning in his De Bello Gothico that the Sibylline Oracles "foretells the misfortunes of the Britons" (Ancient Greek: προλέγει τὰ Βρεττανῶν πάθη, romanized: prolégei tà Brettanôn páthē). Milton Terry's 1899 English translation followed Rzach's edition, translating Βρύτεσσι as "the Britons":

Among the Britons and among the Gauls
Rich in gold, Ocean shall be roaring loud
Filled with much blood; …

— Sibylline Oracles, Book V.

Ulrich von Wilamowitz-Moellendorff, however, suggested that the manuscript reading Βρύτεσσι should be emended to Βρύγεσσι, Brúgessi, in reference to the ancient Bryges. Johannes Geffcken's 1902 critical edition accepted Wilamowitz's emendation, printing Βρύγεσσι. John J. Collins's English text of the Sibylline Oracles in James H. Charlesworth's 1983 edition of translated Old Testament pseudepigrapha follows the manuscript tradition, translating Βρύτεσσι as "the Britains":

Among the Britains and wealthy Gauls
the ocean will be resounding, filled with much blood, …

— Sibylline Oracles, Book V.

Ken Jones, preferring Wilamowitz's emendation, wrote in 2011: "This is not, so far as I can see, a usual translation, nor is this even a Greek word. The Brygi (Βρύγοι) or Briges (Βρίγες), on the other hand, are a known people."

The Divisio orbis terrarum mentioned the British Isles as the Insulae Britannicae or Insulae Britanicae. The text refers to the archipelago together with Gallia Comata: "Gallia Comata, together with the Brittanic islands, is bounded on the east by the Rhine, …" (Latin: Gallia Comata cum insulis Brittanicis finitur ab oriente flumine Rheno, …). According to the editor Paul Schnabel in 1935, the manuscript traditions spelt the name variously as: brittannicis, britannicis, or britanicis.

John Chrysostom's Biblical commentary on the Book of Isaiah, mentions the British Isles in a comment on Isaiah 2:4:

Τότε μὲν γάρ, ὡς ἔφθην εἰπών, καὶ ἐν ἑνὶ ἔθνει μυρίαι συνεχῶς ἐπαναστάσεις ἐγίγνοντο, καὶ πολυπρόσωποι πόλεμοι· νυνὶ δὲ ὅσην ἥλιος ἐφορᾷ γῆν ἀπὸ τοῦ Τίγρητος ἐπὶ τὰς Βρεττανικὰς νήσους, αὐτὴ πᾶσα, καὶ μετὰ ταύτης Λιβύη καὶ Αἴγυπτος καὶ Παλαιστινῶν ἔθνος, μᾶλλον δὲ ἅπαν τὸ ὑπὸ τὴν Ῥωμαίων ἀρχὴν κείμενον.
At that time, as I have said, there were countless rebellions all the time within one nation, and many types of wars. But now, all the earth under the shining sun, from the Tigris to the British Isles, including Egypt and Libya and Palestine, all this and more lies under Roman rule.

— John Chrysostom, In Isaiam, II.5.

In the manuscript copy of the classical Armenian adaptation published in 1880 by the Mekhitarists of San Lazzaro degli Armeni, the British Isles are Բրետանացւոց կղզիք, Bretanacʿwocʿ kłzikʻ, which in the Latin translation of 1887 is Britannicae insulae.

իսկ այժմ՝ աւասիկ արև ընդ երկիր ծագէ, ՚ի Դկղաթ գետոյ մինչև ՚ի Բրետանացւոց կղզիսն, և Հանդերձ այնու Լիբէացւոց կողմանքն, և առ Հասարակ ամենայն երկիրն Եգիպտացւոց, և Պաղեստինացւոց աշխարհն, իբրև զմի ազգ կայ ընդ հնազանդութեամբ՝ ընդ Հոռովմոց տէրութեամբն.
Tunc enim, ut jam dixi, vel in una gente innumeræ sæpe seditiones oriebantur, et diversa bella: nunc autem quantum terræ spatium sol respicit a Tigride usque ad Britannicas insulas, ipsa tota, et cum illa Africa, Ægyptus et gens Palæstinorum, hi omnes, sicuti unica natio, Romano imperio subjacent

— John Chrysostom, In Isaiam, II.5.

In his Contra Collatorem, Prosper of Aquitaine mentioned the British Isles to which Pope Celestine I (r. 422–432) sent Palladius as "the Britains" (Britanniae) including both Great Britain and Ireland – the "Roman island" and the "barbarian island". Prosper praised Celestine as thereby having dealt with Pelagianism in Great Britain and having established Christianity in Ireland:

Nec vero segniore cura ab hoc eodem morbo Britannias liberavit, quando quosdam inimicos gratiae solum suae originis occupantes etiam ab illo secreto exclusit oceani et, ordinato Scottis episcopo, dum Romanam insulam studet seruare catholicam, fecit etiam barbaram christianam
With no less care did [Pope Celestine] free the British Isles from that same disease [i.e. Pelagianism] … and by ordaining a bishop for the Irish, while he strove to keep the Roman island catholic, he also made the barbarian island Christian.

— Prosper of Aquitaine, Contra Collatorem, XXII.

The Ethnica of Stephen of Byzantium mentions the British Isles and lists the Britons as their inhabitants' ethnonym. He comments on the name's variable spelling, noting that Dionysius Periegetes spelt the name with a single tau and that Ptolemy and Marcian of Heraclea had spelt it with a pi:

εἰσὶ καὶ Βρεττανίδες νῆσοι ἐν τῷ ὠκεανῷ, ὧν τὸ ἐθνικὸν Βρεττανοί. Διονύσιος ὑφελὼν τὸ ἓν τ ἔφη "ὠκεανοῦ κέχυται ψυχρὸς ῥόος, ἔνθα Βρετανοί". καὶ ἄλλοι οὕτως διὰ π Πρετανίδες νῆσοι, ὡς Μαρκιανὸς καὶ Πτολεμαῖος.
There are also the Brettanídes Islands (British Isles) in the ocean, to which the ethnikòn is Brettanós. Dionysius removed the one tau [from the name] and said "the cold stream of the ocean is spread out where the Bretanoí [live]". Others also [spell] like this, [however] with pi [as first consonant], Pretanídes Islands, such as [for example] Marcian and Ptolemy.

— Stephen of Byzantium, Ethnica, Β.169.

The Chronographia of John Malalas mentions the British Isles as part of the lands allotted to Japheth in the table of nations.

τοῦ δὲ Ἰάφεθ τοῦ τρίτου υἱοῦ Νῶε ἡ φυλὴ ἔλαβεν τὰς ἀπὸ Μηδίας ἐπὶ τὴν ἄρκτον ἕως Βριττανικῶν νήσων
The tribe of Japheth, Noah's third son, took the territory from Media to the North as far as the British Isles

— John Malalas, Chronographia, I.6.

The anonymous Outline of Geography in Summary (Ὑποτύπωσις τῆς γεογραφίας ἐν ἐπιτομῇ, Hypotýpōsis tễs geographías en epitomễi or Geographiae expositio compendiaria) wrongly attributed to Agathemerus until the mid-19th century mentions "the two Britains" (αἱ Βρεττανικαὶ δύο, hai Brettanikaì dúo), identifies both Ireland and Great Britain, and describes each:

νῆσοι δὲ ταύτης τῆς ἠπείρου ἀξιόλογοι ἐν μὲν τῇ ἐκτὸς θαλάσσῃ αἱ Βρεττανικαὶ δύο, Ἰουερνία τε καὶ Ἀλουίων. Ἀλλ’ ἡ μὲν Ἰουερνία δυτικωτάτη κειμένη ἀντιπαρεκτείνεται μέχρι τινὸς τῇ Ἱσπανίᾳ, ἡ δὲ Ἀλουίων, ἐν ᾗ καὶ τὰ στρατόπεδα ἵδρυται, μεγίστη τέ ἐστι καὶ ἐπιμηκεστάτη· ἀρξαμένη γὰρ ἀπὸ ἄρκτων <ἐπὶ μὲν δύσιν μέχρι τῶν> μέσων τῆς Ταρρακωνησίας πρόεισιν, ἐπ’ ἀνατολὰς <δὲ> μέχρι τῶν μέσων σχεδὸν τῆς Γερμανίας.
The notable islands of this continent are, in the outer sea, the two Brettanikai, Iouernia (Hibernia, Ireland) and Alouion (Albion, Great Britain); but Iouernia is in the westernmost position, extending some way opposite Hispania. Alouion, in which the military camps have been founded, is the largest and most elongated; for beginning from the north it reaches ‹west to the› middle parts of Tarrakonesia, and east almost to the middle of Germania.

— Outline of Geography in Summary, 13.

The Hexaemeron of Jacob of Edessa twice mentions the British Isles (Classical Syriac: ܓܙܪ̈ܬܐ ܒܪܐܛܐܢܝܩܐܣ, romanized: gāzartāʾ Baraṭāniqās), and in both cases identifies Ireland and Great Britain by name:

ܝܘܒܐܪܢܝܐ ܘܐܠܘܐܢܘ ܗܠܝܢ ܕܡܬܩܪ̈ܝܢ ܒܪ̈ܐܛܐܢܝܩܘܣ
… Yūbārnīyā (Hibernia) and Alūʾayūn (Albion), which are called the Baraṭāniqūs (Britains) …

— Jacob of Edessa, Hexaemeron, III.12.

=== Middle Ages ===
At the Synod of Birr, the Cáin Adomnáin signed by clergymen and rulers from Ireland, Gaelic Scotland, and Pictland was binding for feraib Hérenn ocus Alban, 'on the men of Ireland and Britain'. According to Kuno Meyer's 1905 edition, "That Alba here means Britain, not Scotland, is shown by the corresponding passage in the Latin text of § 33: 'te oportet legem in Hibernia Britaniaque perficere'". The text of the Cáin Adomnáin describes itself: Iss ead in so forus cāna Adomnān for Hērinn ⁊ Albain, 'This is the enactment of Adamnan's Law in Ireland and Britain'. The extent of the Cáin Adomnáin's jurisdiction in Britain is unclear; some scholars argue that its British domain was restricted to Dál Riata and Pictland, while others write that it is simply unknown whether it was meant to apply to areas of Britain not under such strong Irish influence.

Adomnán similarly refers to "Ireland and Britain" when commenting on the Plague of 664 in his Life of Columba, writing "oceani insulae per totum, videlicet Scotia et Britannia." He notes that only the people of Pictland and the Irish of Britain ("Pictorum plebe et Scotorum Britanniae") were spared the pestilence.

In the Cosmography of Aethicus Ister, the British Isles are mentioned as having been visited by the protagonist (Dein insolas Brittanicas et Tylen navigavit, quas ille Brutanicas appellavit, ..., 'Then to the British islands and Thule he sailed, which are called the Brutanics'). In 1993, the editor Otto Prinz connected this name with the Etymologiae of Isidore of Seville, in which it is stated: "Some suspect that the Britons were so named in Latin because they are brutes" (Brittones quidam Latine nominatos suspicantur eo, quod bruti sint).

In the Excerpta Latina Barbari, the British Isles (Brittaniacae insulae) are the last of the lands allotted to Japheth in the table of nations:

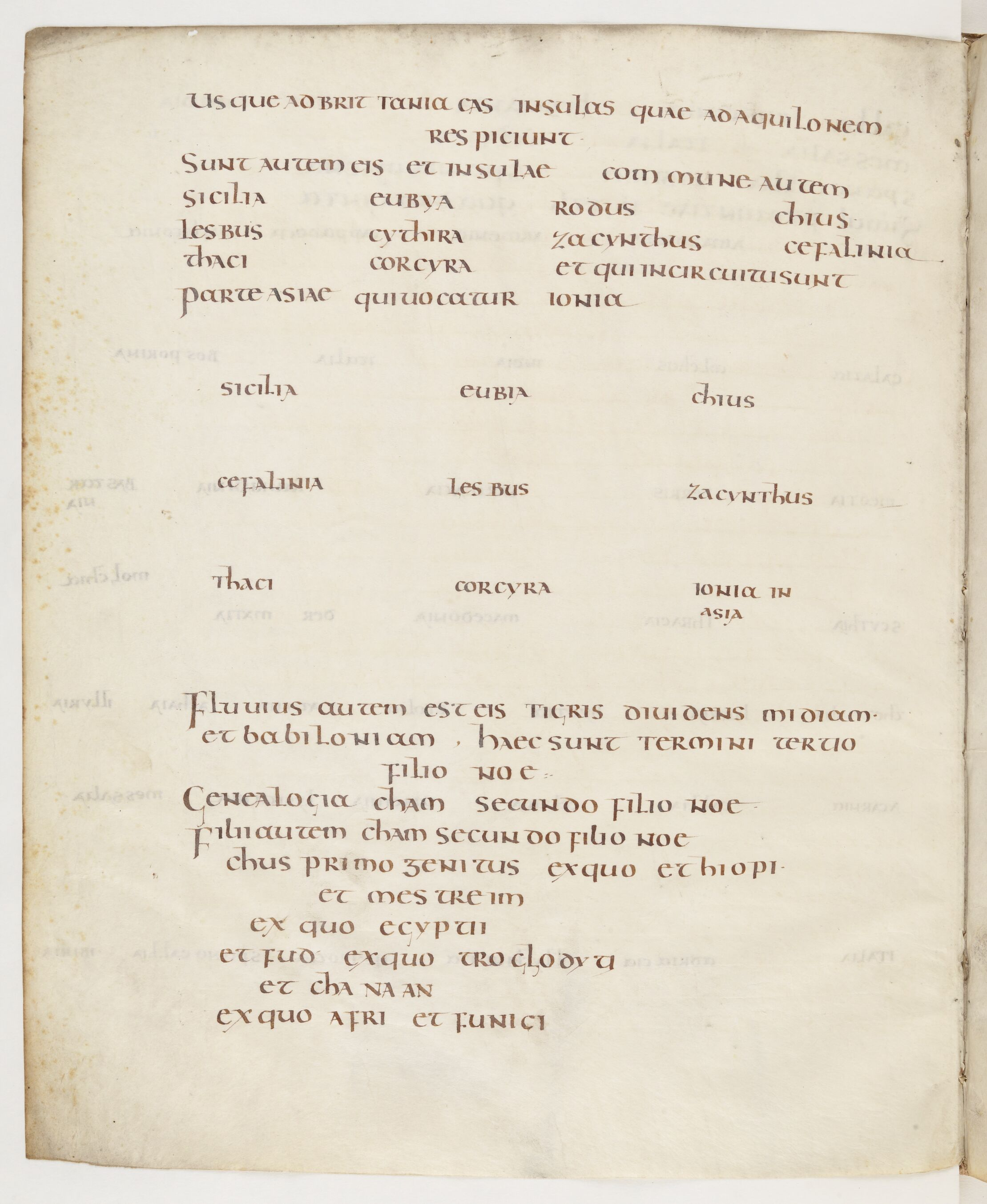
Folio 6 verso of the Bibliothèque nationale de France's manuscript Latin 4884, probably written in the 780s at Corbie Abbey and including the phrase usque ad Brittaniacas insulas, 'all the way to the British Isles'.

Simul provintiae Iafeth quadraginta duae usque ad Brittaniacas insulas quae ad aquilonem respiciunt.
Altogether these are 42 provinces of Japheth all the way to the British Isles, which face to the north.

— Excerpta Latina Barbari, II.3.

In medieval Islamic geography and cartography, the British Isles were known by the Arabic names Jazāʾir Barṭāniya or Jazāʾir Barṭīniya. England was known as Ankarṭara, Inkiltara, or Lanqalṭara (French: l'Angleterre), Scotland as Sqūsiya (Latin: Scotia), and Ireland as Īrlanda or Birlanda. According to Douglas Morton Dunlop, "Whether there was any Arab contact, except perhaps with Ireland, is, however, more than doubtful". Arabic geographies mention the British Isles as twelve islands. The Kitāb az-Zīj of al-Battānī describes the British Isles as the "islands of Britain" (Arabic: جزائر برطانية, romanized: Jazāʾir Barṭāniyah):

طنجة يسمى سبطاً يخرج الى بحر الروم وفيه ايضا من ناحية الشمال جزائر برطانية
In (the Western Ocean) also to the northward are the islands of Barṭiniyah (Britain), twelve in number.

— Al-Battānī, Kitāb az-Zīj.

The Kitāb al-Aʿlāq an-Nafīsa of Ahmad ibn Rustah describes the British Isles as the "twelve islands called Jazāʾir Barṭīnīyah" (Arabic: عشرة جزيرة تسمَّى جزائر برطينية, romanized: ʿashrah jazīrat tusammā Jazāʾir Barṭāniyah). According to Dunlop, this "account of the British Isles follows al-Battāni's almost verbatim and is doubtless derived from it".

In the 9th century, the Irish monk Dicuil mentioned the British Isles together with Gallia Comata: "Gallia Comata, together with the Brittanic islands, is bounded on the east by the Rhine, …" (Latin: Gallia Comata cum insulis Brittanicis finitur ab oriente flumine Rheno, ...). He also describes the Faroe Islands as being two days' sailing from "the northernmost British Isles" (a septentrionalibus Brittaniae insulis duorum dierum ac noctium recta navigatione, 'from the northern islands of Britain in a direct voyage of two days and nights').

According to Irmeli Valtonen in 2008, on the so-called Cotton mappa mundi, an Anglo-Saxon mappa mundi based on the Old English Orosius, "The largest feature is the British Isles, which is indicated by the inscription Brittannia". The same codex, Codex Tiberius B.V.1, also contains a copy of Priscian's translation of Dionysius Periegetes's Orbis descriptio, and according to Sean Michael Ryan, "Britain is described, strikingly, as a pair of islands (geminae […] Britannides), comparatively vast in scale (among the islands of the Ocean). For a monastic viewer of our mappa mundi these twin islands are identifiable as Britannia and Hibernia ... although on the drawn map the former dwarfs the latter." Furthermore, according to Ryan, "The verse description of the Periēgēsis encourages the monastic reader to simultaneously locate the British isles (plural) with reference both to the continent of Europe – the mouth of the Rhine – and to the northern periphery of the encircling Ocean. The British isles are related to, yet distinct from, the continent of Europe as islands of the encircling Ocean." The codex therefore distinguishes Great Britain and Ireland from Thule: "The twin isles of the Britannides are distinguished from the ultimate peripheral territory of Thule, however, unlike in some of the Periēgēsis's own sources, notably Pytheas, which treat the British isles as a plurality of islands more closely associated with and perhaps even including Thule. Instead, Dionysius separates the isles of the Britains (565–569) from Thule (580–586)". Ryan adds that through remarks on an island off the Loire estuary, "Dionysius's account, like the mappa mundi itself, connects the island(s) of the Britains with Brittany (a location that the mappa mundi describes as sudbryttas)". According to Ryan therefore, the Anglo-Saxon reader of the Cotton Tiberius B.V.1 codex is given an impression that:

The isles of the Britains (notably effacing Hibernia's name and identity) are both a peripheral northern landmass of the encircling chaos waters of the Ocean, yet also pinpointed geographically with reference to Germania (the mouth of the Rhine) and Gaul (islands in Brittany). The British isles are located in the poet's verse description of Europe (and not Asia or Africa) but grouped more closely with the islands of the Ocean than the continent. In sum, Britannia is both related to continental Europe, yet distinct from it, as a twin-island of the Ocean.

The anonymous Ḥudūd al-ʿĀlam describes the British Isles as the "twelve islands" (Persian: دوازده جزیره) which are "called Briṭāniya" (Persian: جزیرها برطانیه خوانند).

The Kitāb at-Tanbīh wa'l-Ishrāf of al-Masʿūdī describes the British Isles as "the so-called Isles of Britain, twelve in number" (Arabic: الجزائر المسماة برطانية وفى اثنتا عشرة جزيرة, romanized: al-jazāʾir al-musammāh Barṭāniyah wa-fī ithnatā ʿashrah jazīrat).

In the Imago Mundi of Honorius Augustodunensis, the British Isles are all treated under the heading Britannia, the title of the twenty-ninth chapter:

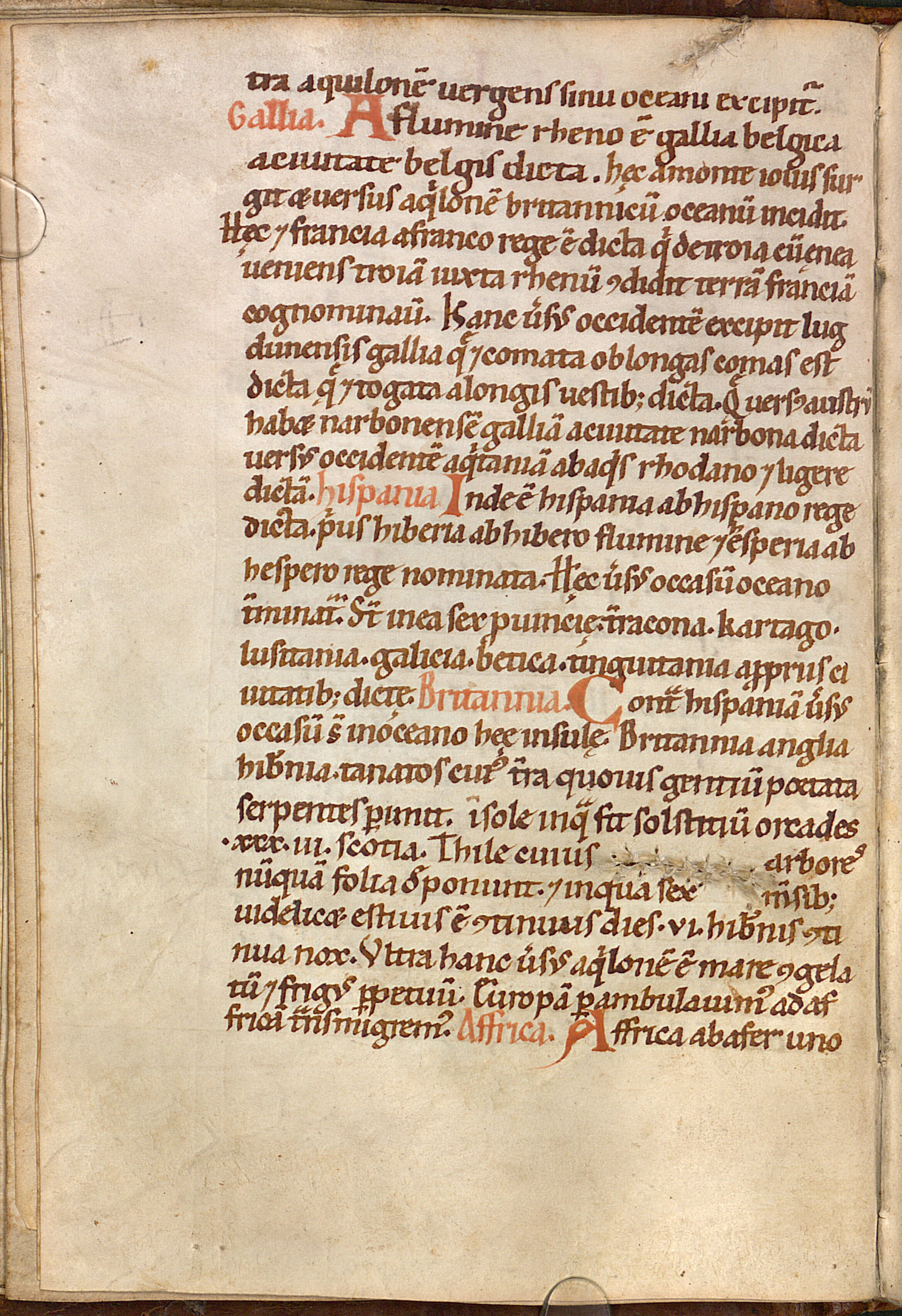
Munich, Bayerische Staatsbibliothek, Clm 536, fol. 9v. An early manuscript of Honorius Augustodunensis's Imago Mundi, copied at Prüll between 1143 and 1147, which includes the rubric Britannia.

Contra Hispaniam versus occasum sunt in oceano heę insulę, Britannia Anglia, Hibernia, Tanatos cuius terra quovis gentium portata serpentes perimit, Insole in qua fit solstitium, Orcades .xxxiii., Scotia, Thile cuius arbores numquam folia deponunt, et in qua vi. mensibus videlicet estivis est continuus dies, .vi. hibernis continua nox. Ultra hanc versus aquilonem est mare congelatum et frigus perpetuum.

John Tzetzes mentioned the British Isles in the eighth book of his Chiliades as Αἱ Βρεττανίδες νῆσοι, hai Brettanídes nē̂soi, 'the Brettanides islands', describing them as "two of the greatest of all" (δύο αἱ μέγισται πασῶν, dyo hai mégistai pasō̂n) and naming them as Ἰουερνία, Iouernía and Ἀλουβίων, Aloubíōn. According to Jane Lightfoot, John Tzetzes's conception of the British Isles was "two major islands plus thirty Orkneys and Thule near them".

According to the University of Michigan's Middle English Dictionary, the Middle English word Britlond, Brutlond or Brutlonde (from the Old English: Brytland) could mean either "ancient Britain" or "the British Isles," while a "Brit" was "A Celt: specif., Welshman, Breton". The noun Britoun (variously spelled Britton, Briton, Bryton, Brytoun, Bruton, Brutun, Brutin, Breton, Bretonn, or Britaygne) meant "a native of the British Isles, a Celt". The same word was also an adjective meaning "Brittonic, British" or "Breton".

The English texts of the popular work Mandeville's Travels mention Great Britain in the context of the invention of the True Cross by Helena, mother of Constantine I, who was supposed to be a daughter of the legendary British king Coel of Colchester. The so-called "Defective" manuscript tradition – the most widespread English version – spelled the toponym "Britain" in various ways. In the 2002 critical edition by M. C. Seymour based on manuscript 283 in the library of Queen's College, Oxford, the text says of Helena, in Middle English: … þe whiche seynt Elyn was moder of Constantyn emperour of Rome, and heo was douȝter of kyng Collo, þat was kyng of Engelond, þat was þat tyme yclepid þe Grete Brutayne, …. In the 2007 edition by Tamarah Kohanski and C. David Benson based on manuscript Royal 17 C in the British Library, the text is: … Ingelond that was that tyme called the Greet Brytayne …. The chronicler John Stow in 1575 and the poet William Slatyer in 1621 each cited the spelling of "Brutayne" or "Brytayne" in Mandeville's Travels as evidence that Brutus of Troy was the origin of the name of the British Isles.

The Annals of Ulster describe Viking raids against what it refers to as "Islands of Britain" under the Latin entry for the year 793: Uastatio omnium insolarum Britannię a gentilibus, 'Devastation of all the islands of Britain by heathens' or, in one 19th century translation, 'a devastation of all the British isles by pagans'. The surviving Early Modern English translation by Conall Mag Eochagáin of the since-lost Gaelic Annals of Clonmacnoise also describes this attack on "Islands of Britain", but under the year 791: "All the Islands of Brittaine were wasted & much troubled by the Danes; this was thiere first footing in England." According to Alex Woolf in 2007, the report in the Annals of Ulster "has been interpreted as a very generalised account of small-scale raids all over Britain" but that argues that "Such generalised notices … are not common in the Irish chronicles". Woolf compares the Annals of Ulster's "islands of Britain" with the "islands of Alba" mentioned by the Chronicon Scotorum. The Chronicon describes Muirchertach mac Néill's attack on the "islands of Alba" (Irish: hinsib Alban) under the entry for the year 940 or 941: Murcablach la Muircertach mac Néll go ttug orgain a hinsib Alban, 'A fleet was fitted out by Muircertach, son of Niall, and he brought plunder from the islands of Alba.' According to Woolf, "This latter entry undoubtedly refers to the Hebrides". Woolf argues that "It seems likely that the islands of Alba/Britain was the term used in Ireland specifically for the Hebrides (which makes very good sense from the perspective of our chroniclers based in the northern half of Ireland)". The Annals of the Four Masters's report on the death of Fothad I under the year 961 describes him as Fothaḋ, mac Brain, scriḃniḋ ⁊ espucc Insi Alban, 'Fothadh, son of Bran, scribe and Bishop of Insi-Alban'. John O'Donovan's 1856 edition glossed "Insi-Alban" as "the islands of Scotland". According to Woolf in 2007, this "is the latest use of the term 'Islands of Alba' for the Hebrides (probably just the islands from Tiree south)". According to Alasdair Ross in 2011, the "islands of Alba" are "presumably the Western Isles".

=== Early Modern Period ===
Michael Critobulus, in his History's dedicatory letter to Mehmed II (r. 1444–1481), expressed his hope that by writing in Greek his work would have a wide audience, including "those who inhabit the British Isles" (Greek: τοῖς τὰς Βρετανικὰς Νήσους οἰκοῦσι, romanized: toîs tàs Bretanikàs Nḗsous oikoûsi). According to Charles T. Riggs in 1954, Critobulus "distinctly states that he hopes to influence the Philhellenes in the British Isles by this story of a Turkish sultan".

Francesco Berlinghieri's 1482 Italian verse adaptation of Ptolemy's Geographia describes both Ireland and Great Britain as British islands in the fourth and fifth chapters of the second book. The sito di Ibernia isola, 'site of the island Hibernia', begins:

Britannica hora ibernia isola e questa
& dagli habitatori e decta irlanda
laquale inprima adnoi si manifesta.
Dalla uernara ibernia si domanda
britannica perche era da brettoni
possessa aquali adouardo hor chomanda.

The British Hibernia island is this,
and by its inhabitants is called Ireland,
which first to us manifests itself.
From the spring it is named Hibernia,
British because it was by the Britons
possessed, whom Edward now commands.

— Francesco Berlinghieri, Geografia, II.4.

Berlinghieri's sito dalbione isola, 'site of the island Albion', begins:

E lato boreale hora albione
Britannica dimonstra isola ilquale
lisola Scotia ha insua giuriditione.

From the northern side now Albion,
the British island, shows, which
has the island Scotia in its jurisdiction.

— Francesco Berlinghieri, Geografia, II.5.

John Skelton's English translation of Poggio Bracciolini's Latin translation of Diodorus Siculus's preface to his Bibliotheca historica, written in the middle 1480s, mentions the British Isles as the yles of Bretayne.

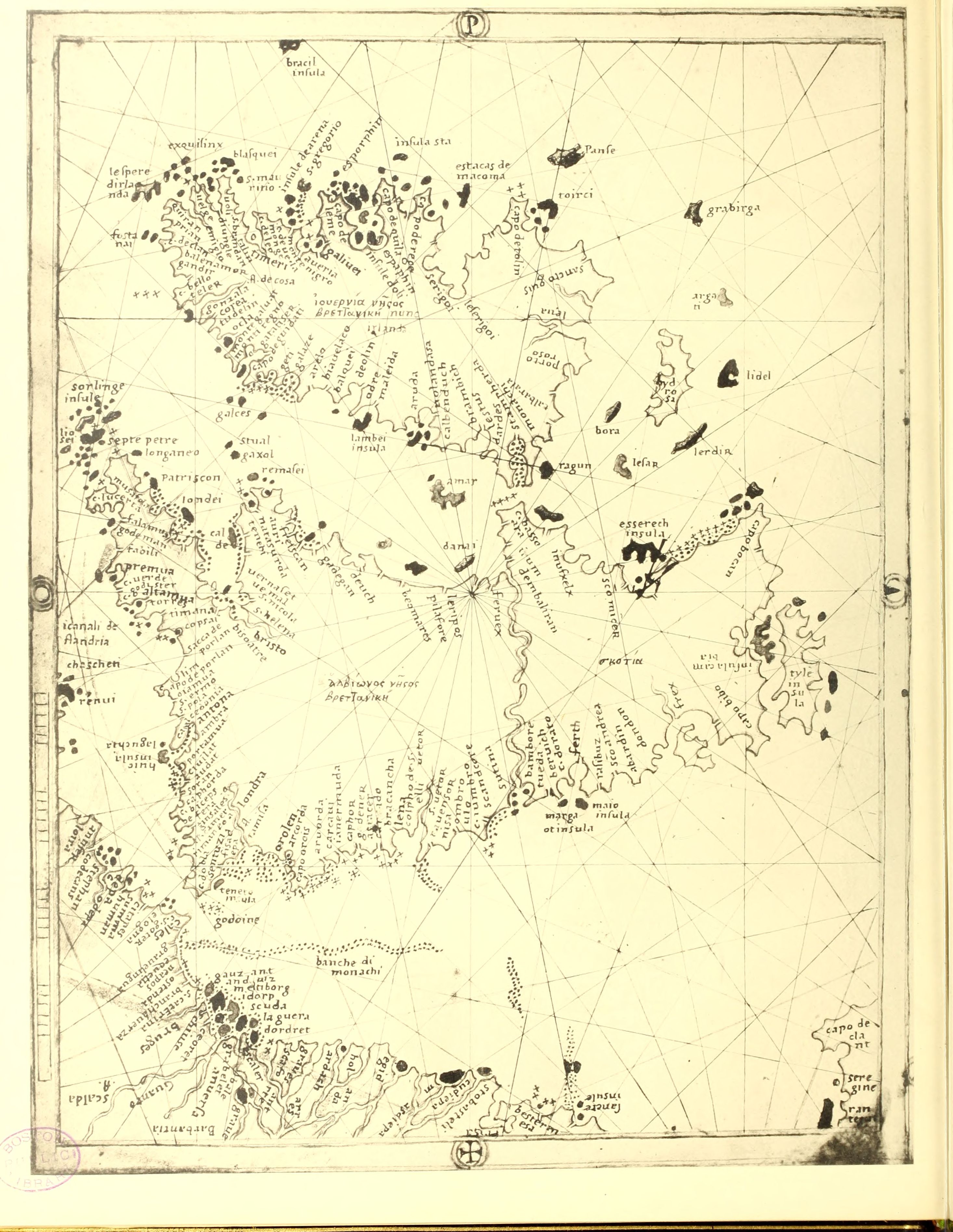
Portolan chart of the British Isles from the Egerton 2803 maps (folio 6b), probably made by Visconte Maggiolo between 1508 and 1510 and now in the British Library. Great Britain and Ireland are each labelled in Ancient Greek: νῆσος Βρεττανική, romanized: nê̄sos Brettanikḗ, lit. 'a British island'.

Andronikos Noukios, a Greek writing under the pen name Nikandros Noukios (Latin: Nicander Nucius), visited Great Britain in the reign of Henry VIII (r. 1509–1547) as part of an embassy. In his account, he describes the British Isles as having taken their name from colonists from Brittany, rather than the other way around. He wrote:

Καὶ τὰς μὲν νήσους ταύτας ἁπάσας καλοῦσι κυρίως Βρετανικὰς, ὡς πάλαι ὑπὸ τῶν ἐν τῇ Βρετανίᾳ τῶν ἐν Γαλατείᾳ οἰκητόρων, ἀποικίαν στειλάντων, καὶ τὰς νήσους οἰκησάντων. Μετηλλάχθησαν δ᾽ ὑπὸ τῶν ὀψιγόνων αἱ ὀνομασίαι κατὰ καιρόν. Καὶ ἡ μὲν καλεῖται Αγγλία, ἡ δὲ Σκοτία, ἡ ἑτέρα δὲ Ἱβερνία καὶ ἄλλη ἄλλως.
Appropriately they call these islands Brittanic because long ago the dwellers in Brittany – which is in France – sent out a colony and peopled the islands. The names were altered by later generations according to circumstances, and one island was called England, another Scotland, another Hibernia, and others likewise.

— The Travels of Nikandros Noukios of Corfu, II.

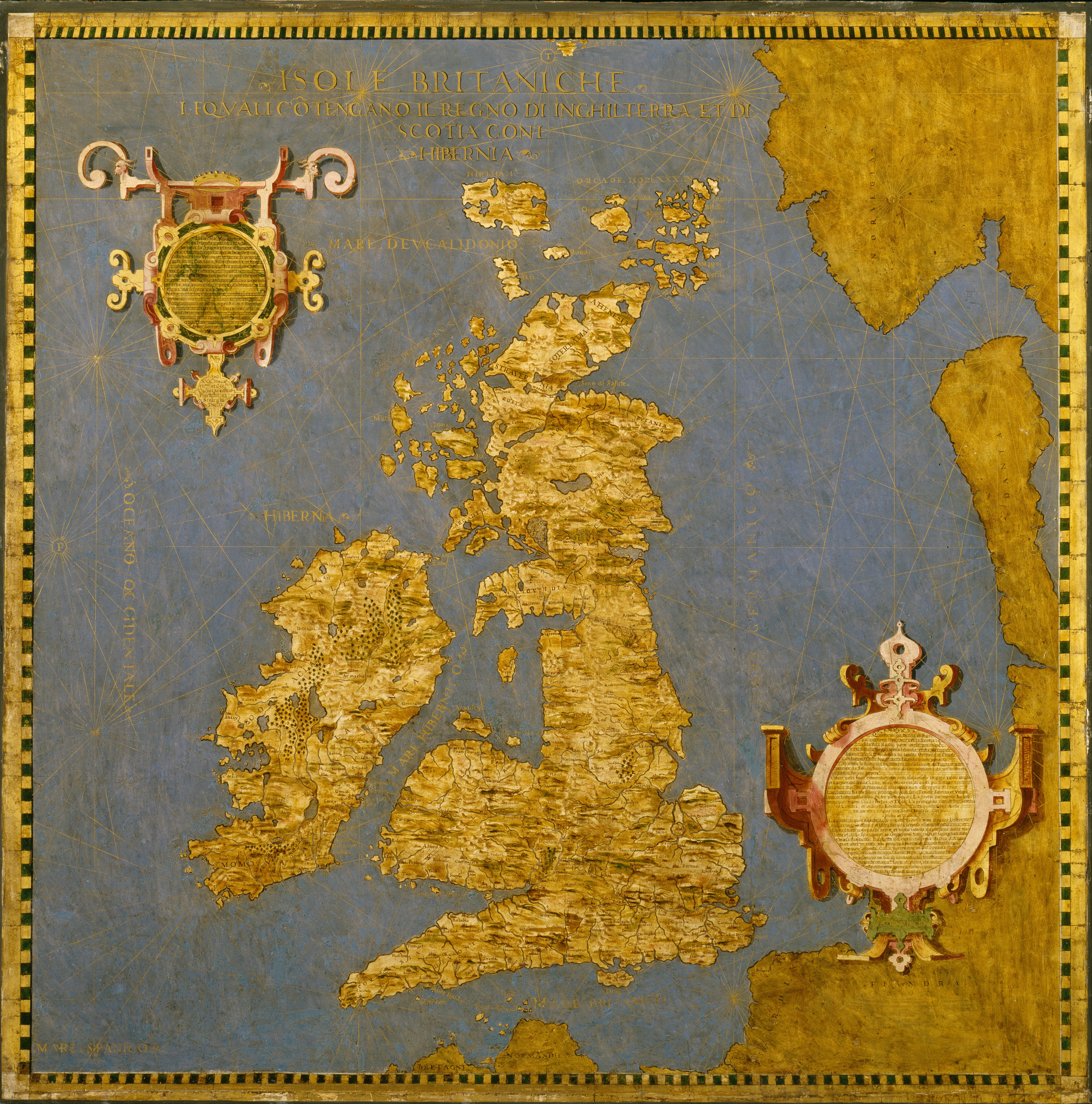
Ignazio Danti's map of the British Isles from the Florentine Palazzo Vecchio's Stanza delle Mappe geografiche, 1565: Isole Britaniche: Lequalico tengano il regno di Inghilterra et di Scotia con l'Hibernia

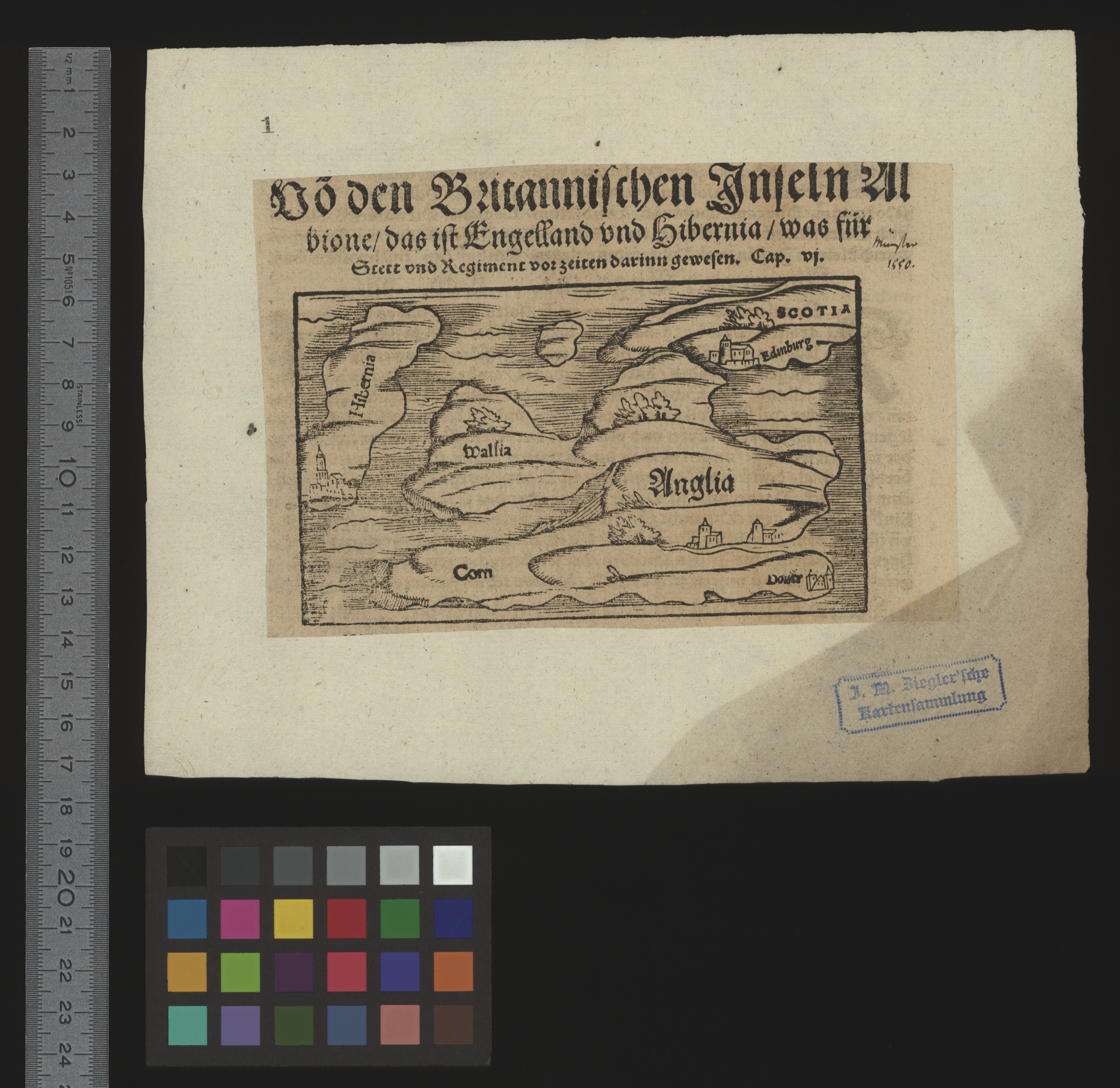
Simplified German version of Ptolemy's "first map of Europe", representing the British Isles (Britannische Inseln), from Sebastian Münster's 1550 German edition of his Cosmographia published in Basel (Basel University Library).

Gerardus Mercator, on his 1538 world map on a double cordiform projection, labelled the British Isles Insulę Britannicę.

By the middle of the 16th century, the term appears on maps made by geographers including Sebastian Münster. Münster in Geographia Universalis, 'Universal Geography' (a 1550 reissue of Ptolemy's Geography) uses the heading De insulis Britannicis, Albione, quæ est Anglia & Hibernia, & de ciuitatibus earum in genere, 'Of the Britannic islands, Albion, which is England, and Ireland, and of their cities in general'.

Mercator, in the legend to the map of the British Isles he published as Angliae, Scotiae & Hiberniae nova descriptio at Duisburg in 1564, refers to the work as hanc Britannicarum insularum descriptionem, 'this description of the British Isles'. On the map itself, a cartouche in the Irish Sea contains the statement veteres appellarunt has insulas Britannicas, 'the ancients called these islands Britannic'.

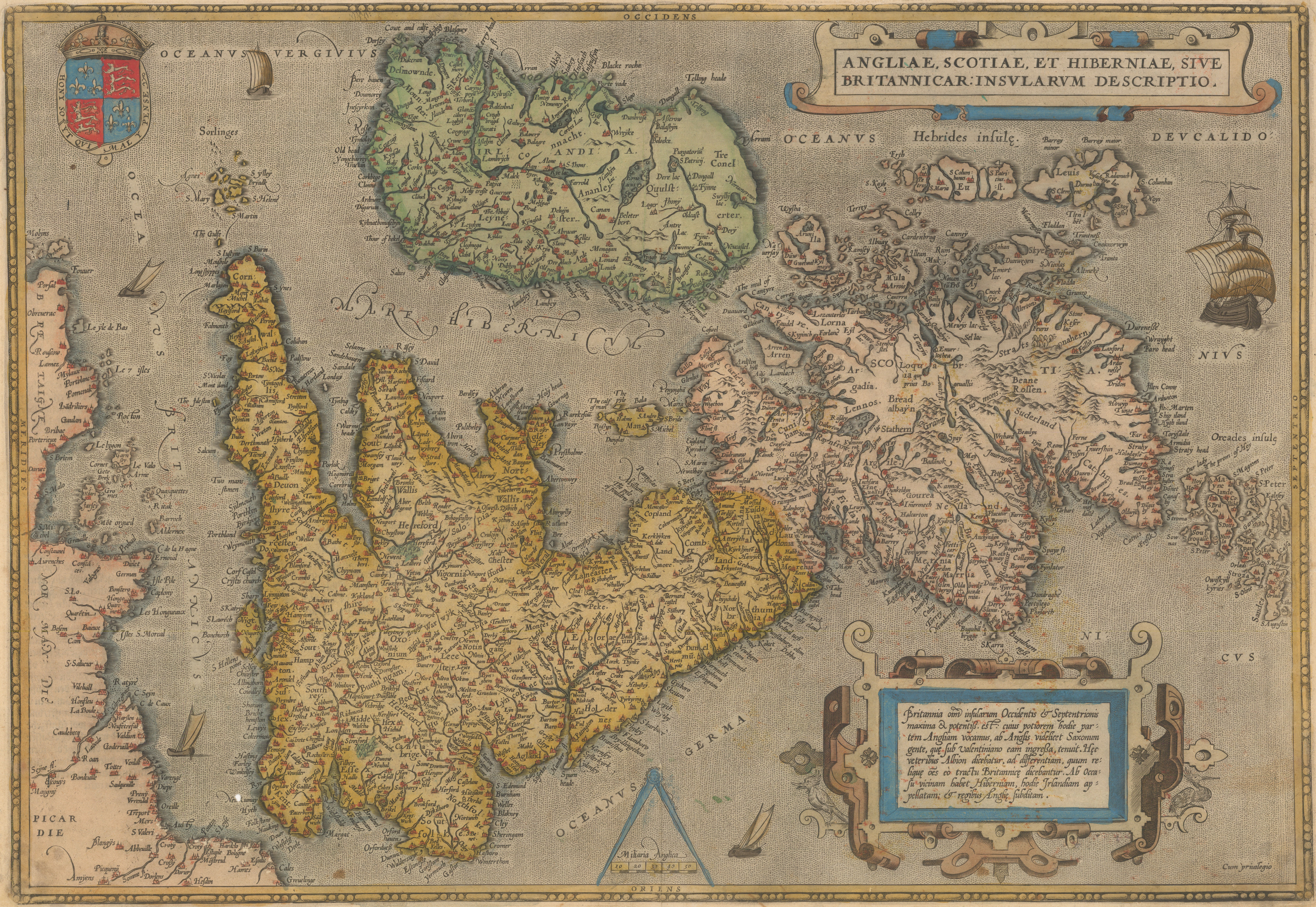
A copy of Abraham Ortelius's map of the British Isles, published by Christophe Plantin at Antwerp c. 1588, entitled in Latin: Angliae, Scotiae et Hiberniae, sive Britannicar. insularum descriptio, lit. 'A description of England, of Scotland, and of Ireland, or of the Britannic islands'. (National Library of Israel).

Abraham Ortelius, in his atlas of 1570 (Theatrum Orbis Terrarum), uses the title Angliae, Scotiae et Hiberniae, sive Britannicar. insularum descriptio, 'A description of England, of Scotland, and of Ireland, or of the Britannic islands'. According to Philip Schwyzer, "This is among the very first early modern references to the 'British Isles', a term used anciently by Pliny but rarely in the medieval period or earlier in the sixteenth century".

Thomas Twyne's English translation of Dionysius Periegetes's Orbis descriptio, published in 1572, mentions the British Isles as the Iles of Britannia.

John Stow, citing Aethicus Ister, Mandeville's Travels, and Geoffrey of Monmouth, described the naming of Great Britain and the British Isles by Brutus of Troy (Early Modern English: Brute) in his 1575 work A Summarie of the Chronicles of England. According to Stow's second chapter, Brutus:

... aryved in this Ilande, whyche was called Albion, at a place now called Totnes in Devonshire, the yere of the world. 2855. the yeare before Christs nativitie. 1108. wherein he first began to raigne, and named it Britaine, (as some write) or rather after his owne name Brutaine, as Æthicus that wonderfull Philosopher (a Scithian by race, but an Istrian by countrey) translated by saint Hierome above a thousand yeares past, termeth both it and the Iles adiacent Insulas Britanicas. And for more proufe of this restored name, not only the sayde Philosopher (who travelled through many lands, and in this lande taught the knowledge of minerall works) maye be alledged, but sundrie other: & some English wryters above an hundred yeares since, usually do so name it, and not otherwise, through a large historie of this land, translated out of Frenche.

— John Stow, A Summarie of the Chronicles of England, 1575, page 17–18.

The 1580 edition of Stow's work spelled the Latin name Insulas Brutannicas and the English names Brutan and the Brytaines, and additionally cited the authority of the Sibylline Oracles for the conflation of the Latin letter Y with the Ancient Greek: υ or Υ (upsilon):

... the Sybils Oracles, who in the name of the Brytaines is written with y. that is the Greekes little u. whyche Oracles althoughe they were not the Sibils owne worke, as some suspecte, yet are they very antient indeede, and that they might seeme more auntient, use the moste auntient name of Countreys and peoples

— John Stow, A Summarie of the Chronicles of England, 1580, page 17–18.

Schwyzer states that Raphael Holinshed's 1577 Chronicles of England, Scotland, and Ireland is the first work of historiography to deal with the British Isles in particular; "To the best of my knowledge, no book published in England before 1577 specified in its title a scope at once inclusive of and restricted to England, Scotland, and Ireland". According to Holinshed himself in the second chapter (Of the auncient names of this Islande) of the first book (An Historicall Description of the Islande of Britayne, with a briefe rehearsall of the nature and qualities of the people of Englande, and of all such commodities as are to be founde in the same) of the first volume of the Chronicles, Brutus had both renamed Albion after himself and given his name to the British Isles as a whole:

... Brute, who arriving here in the 1127, before Christ, and 2840. after the creation, not onely chaunged it into Britayne (after it had bene called Albion, by the space of 595. yeares) but to declare his sovereigntie over the reast of the Islandes also that are about the same, he called them all after the same maner, so that Albion was sayde in tyme to be Britanniarum insula maxima, that is, the greatest of those Isles that bare the name of Britayne.

— Raphael Holinshed, Chronicles of England, Scotland, and Ireland, 1577, Volume I, chapter 2, page 2.

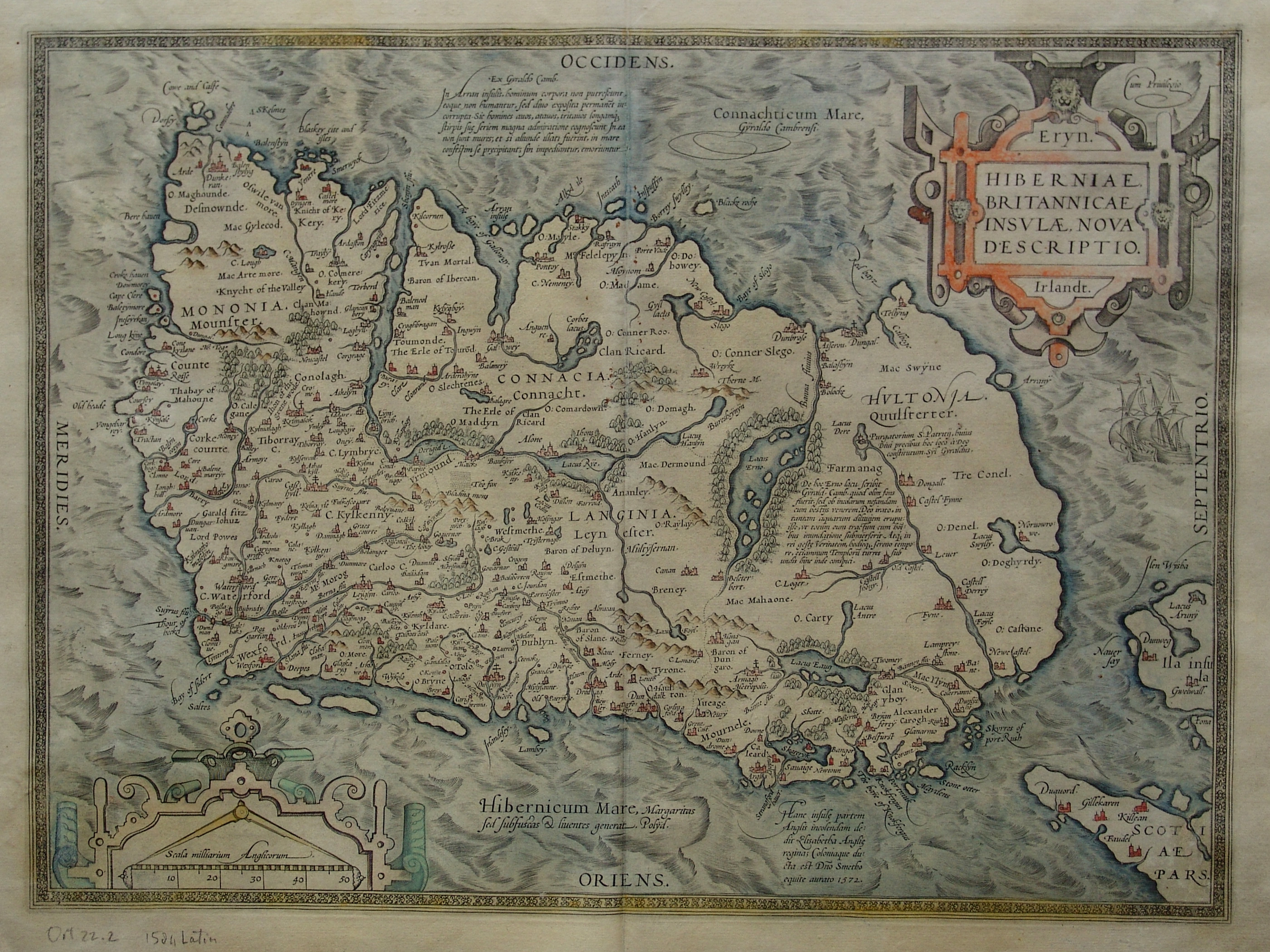
A copy of Abraham Ortelius's map of Ireland, published at Antwerp, 1575, labelled with various names of the island, which is described as a "Britannic island": Eryn: Hiberniae, Britannicae Insulæ, Nova Descriptio Irlandt

The geographer and occultist John Dee (of Welsh ancestry) was an adviser to Elizabeth I (r. 1558–1603) and prepared maps for several explorers. He helped to develop legal justifications for colonisation by Protestant England, breaking the duopoly the Pope had granted to the Spanish and Portuguese Empires. Dee coined the term "British Empire" and built his case, in part, on the claim of a "British Ocean"; including Britain, Ireland, Iceland, Greenland and (possibly) North America, he used alleged Saxon precedent to claim territorial and trading rights. According to Ken MacMillan, "his imperial vision was simply propaganda and antiquarianism, without much practical value and of limited interest to the English crown and state."

Dee used the term "Brytish Iles" in his General and Rare Memorials Pertaining to Perfecte Arte of Navigation of 1577. Dee also referred to the Imperiall Crown of these Brytish Ilandes, which he called an Ilandish Monarchy, and to the Brytish Ilandish Monarchy. According to Frances Yates, Dee argued that the advice given by the Byzantine Neoplatonist philosopher Gemistos Plethon in two orations addressed to the emperor Manuel II Palaiologos (r. 1373–1425) and his son Theodore II Palaiologos (r. 1407–1448) "on the affairs of the Peloponnesus and on ways and means both of improving the economy of the Greek islands and of defending them" should inform Elizabeth I's claims to territorial waters and adjacent territories. Dee described these orations as "now published" – they had been translated into Latin by Willem Canter from a manuscript owned by János Zsámboky and published at Antwerp in 1575 by Christophe Plantin. Dee wrote:

Moreover, (Sayd he) if it should not be taken in worse parte, of our soveraign, than, of the Emperour of Constantinople, Emanuel, the syncere Intent, and faythfull Advise, of Georgius Gemistus Pletho, was, I could (proportionally, for the occasion of the Tyme, and place,) frame and shape very much of Gemistus those his two Greek Orations, (the first, to the Emperor, and the Second to his Sonne, Prince Theodore:) for our brytish iles, and in better and more allowable manner, at this Day, for our People, than that his Plat (for Reformation of the State, at those Dayes, (could be found, for Peloponnesus, avaylable. But, Seeing those Orations, are now published: both in Greek and Latin, I need not Dowbt, but they, to whom, the chief Care of such causes is committed, have Diligently selected the Hony of those Flowres, already, for the Common-Wealths great Benefit.

— John Dee, General and Rare Memorials Pertaining to Perfecte Arte of Navigation, 1577.

According to Yates, "In spite of the difficulties of Dee's style and punctuation his meaning is clear" – Dee argued "that the advice given to the Byzantine Emperor by Pletho is good advice for Elizabeth, the Empress of Britain". Dee believed that the British Isles had originally been called the "Brutish Isles", a name he had read in Aethicus Ister's Cosmography, which he thought was written in Classical Antiquity. Invoking the Cosmography of Aethicus and its supposed translator Jerome, Dee argued that the British Isles had been misnamed, noting:

S^{t} Hierome his admiration of ethicus his assert[ion] that these Iles of albion and irelande sho[ld] be called brutanicae & not britannicae

— John Dee, Of Famous and Rich Discoveries, 1577, British Library, Cotton MS. Vitellius. C. VII. art. 3, fols. 202 r–v.

According to Peter J. French, "Like Leland, Lhuyd and other antiquarians, Dee believed that it was mistakes in orthography and pronunciation that had confused the spelling of the name", which had come from the name of Brutus. The supposed alteration in spelling had caused:

the [origin] all Di[s] coverer & Conqueror, and the very first absolute king of these Septentrionall brytish Islands, to be forgotten: or some wrong person, in undue Chronography, with repugnant circumstances, to be nominated in our brutus the italien trojan, his stede.

— John Dee, Of Famous and Rich Discoveries, 1577, British Library, Cotton MS. Vitellius. C. VII. art. 3, fols. 202 r–v.

In his copy of John Bale's Scriptorum illustrium maioris Brytanniae catalogus (later in Christ Church Library), at Bale's passage on Gildas, Dee had added an annotation on Brutus, stating: "Note this authority of Gildas concerning Brutus and Brytus, and remember that from the most ancient authority of the astronomer Aethicus, they were called the Brutish Islands" (Nota hanc Gildae authoritatem de Bruto et Bryto, et memor esto de Ethici astronomi authoritate antiquissima, insulas Brutanicas dictas esse)". He underlined Bale's words: "up to the entrance of Brutus, or rather Brytus" (usque ad Bruti, potius Bryti introitum).

In his Britannia, published in Latin in 1586, William Camden cited the Sibylline Oracles for evidence of the antiquity of Britain's toponym and of its origin in the name of the Britons, quoting both the Greek text published by Birck and the Latin translation by Castellio. Camden and Philemon Holland's 1610 English language edition of the work included the same arguments:

Eadem ratione necessario credamus hanc nostram insulam Britanniam ab incolis vel vicinis Gallis denominatam esse, quos Brit, vel Brith barbare dictos fuisse persuadent nonnulla, inprimis ille qui Sibyllæ nomine circumfertur versiculus.
In the same sort we must of necessitie think that this our Island Britaine tooke denomination from the Inhabitants, or from the Gaules their neighbours: That these first Inhabitants were called Brit or Brith, some things induce me to thinke. First and foremost, that verse which goeth about under the name of Sibylla:

— William Camden, Britannia, 1607 and 1610 editions.

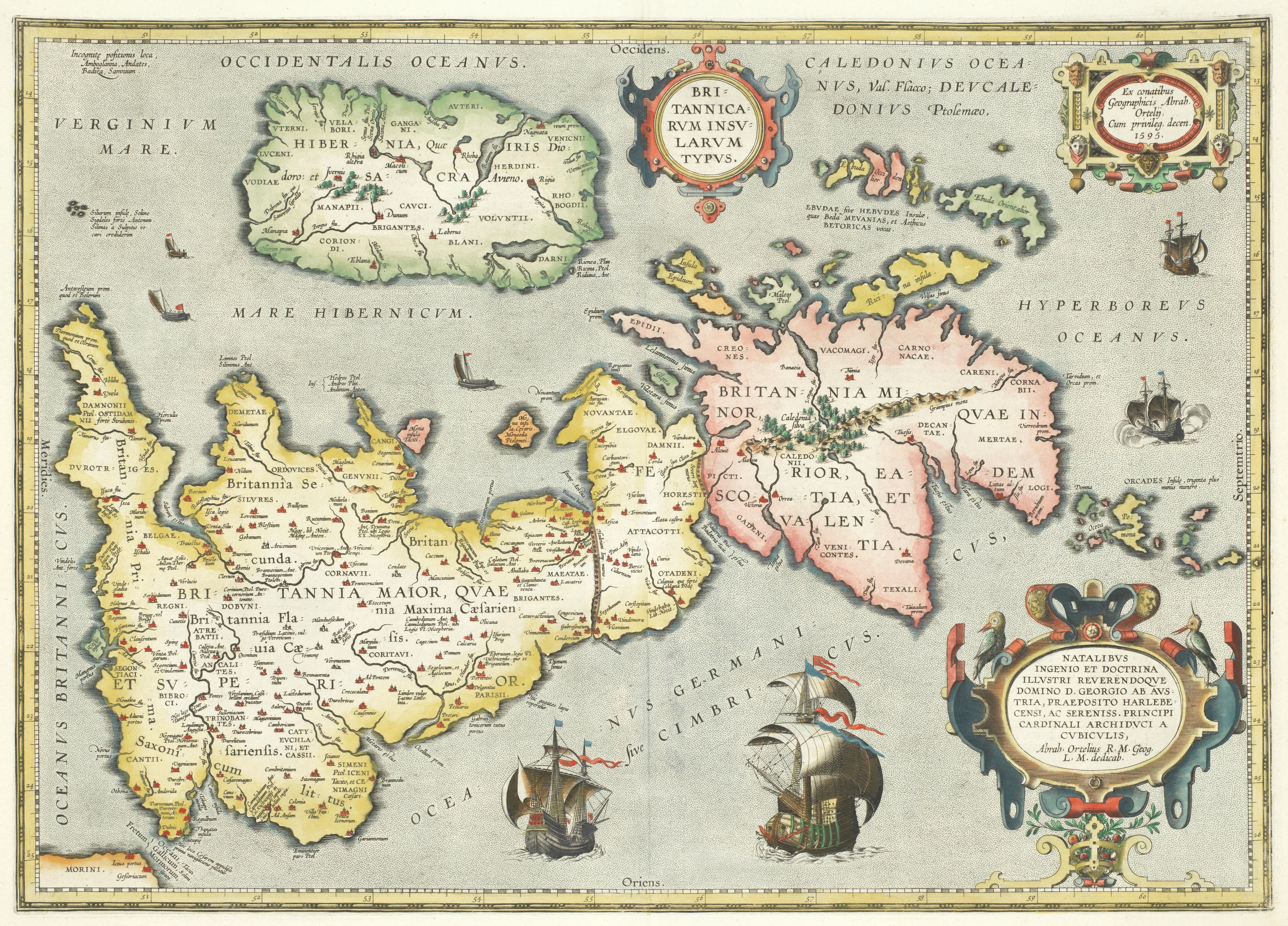
A copy of Abraham Ortelius's map of the British Isles, published at Antwerp, 1595, entitled in Latin: Britanniarum insularum typus, lit. 'print of the British islands'. Northern Great Britain is labelled Britannia minor, quae inferior, eadem Scotia, et Valentia, 'Lesser Britain, which is lower, the same as Scotland and Valentia' and southern Great Britain is labelled Britannia maior, quae et superior, 'Greater Britain, which is higher'.

According to John Morrill, at the time of the Union of the Crowns under the Stuart dynasty in the early 17th century, the historic and mythological relationship of Ireland and Great Britain was conceptualised differently to the relationship between the kingdoms of England and Scotland. While the British Isles was considered a geographic unit, the political debate on the Union involved the English and Scottish kingdoms, but not Ireland. James VI and I promoted political unity between Scotland ("North Britain") and England ("South Britain"), introducing the Union Flag and the title "King of Great Britain", but the same was not true of Ireland. Since the Middle Ages, Britain had been understood to be a historical unit once ruled by the legendary kings of Britain, of whom the first had been Brutus of Troy – as described in the work of Geoffrey of Monmouth. Unlike Wales, England, and Scotland, Ireland did not form part of this mythological concept, which was itself in decline by 1600.

The Latin expression rex Britanniarum, 'king of the Britains' or 'king of the British Isles' was used by some panegyrists of James VI and I after his accession to the Anglo-Irish throne and his proclamation as "king of Great Britain". Andrew Melville used the title for his 1603 Latin poem Votum pro Iacobo sexto Britanniarum rege, 'Vow for James the Sixth, king of the Britains'. Isaac Wake used the same title in his Latin poem on the king's August 1605 visit to Oxford: Rex platonicus: sive, De potentissimi principis Iacobi Britanniarum Regis, ad illustrissimam Academiam Oxoniensem, 'The Platonic king, or: On the most potent prince James, king of the Britains, to the most illustrious University of Oxford'. For James's assumption of the triune British monarchy, Hugo Grotius composed his Inauguratio regis Brittaniarum anno MDCIII, 'Inauguration of the king of the Britains in the year 1603', which extolled the historic naval powers of English kings and which was cited approvingly by John Selden in his 1635 work Mare Clausum: Of the Dominion, or, Ownership of the Sea. Stanley Bindoff noted that the same title Rex Britanniarum was formally adopted in 1801.

In John Speed's 1611 Theatre of the Empire of Great Britaine, the cartographer refers to the islands as Britannish. Before the first chapter, Speed introduces his map of the British Isles as "The British Ilands, proposed in one view in the ensuing map".

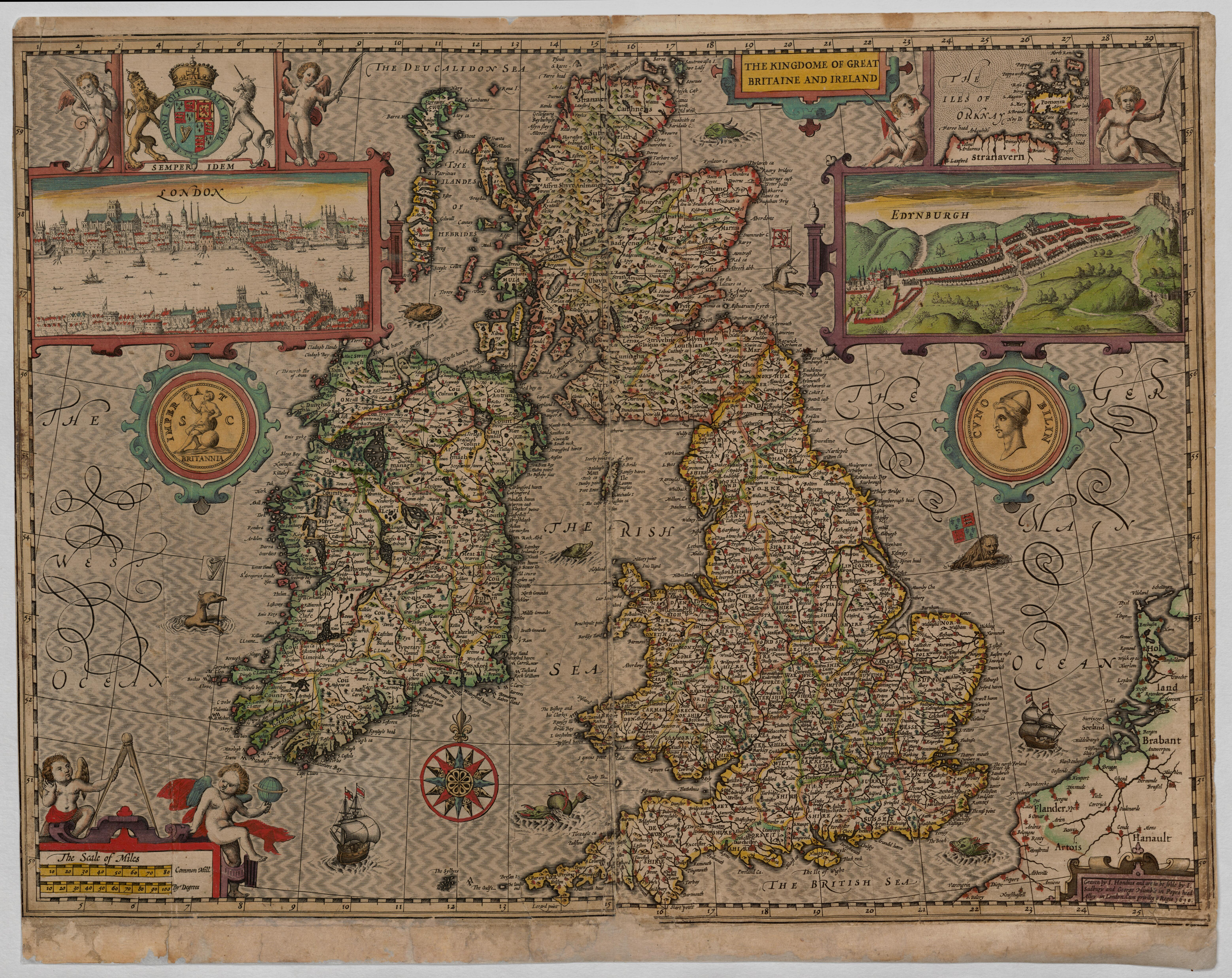
A copy of John Speed's 1611 map of the British Isles, labelled The Kingdome of Great Britaine and Ireland (Cambridge Digital Library).

Speed describes the position of "the Iland of Great Britaine" as being north and east of Brittany, Normandy, and the other parts of the coast of Continental Europe:

It hath Britaine, Normandy, and other parts of France upon the South, the Lower Germany, Denmarke, and Norway upon the East; the Isles of Orkney and the Deucaledonian Sea, upon the North; the Hebrides upon the West, and from it all other Ilands, and Ilets, which doe scatteredly environ it, and shelter themselves (as it were) under the shadow of Great Albion (another name of this famous Iland) are also accounted Britannish, & are therefore here described altogether

— John Speed, Theatre of the Empire of Great Britaine, 1611

In his 1621 verse work Palæ-Albion: The history of Great Britanie from the first peopling of this island to this present raigne of or happy and peacefull monarke K: James, William Slatyer described the British Isles as named "the Brutus Iles in Greeke Dialect". Slatyer explained this spelling of the name in a marginal note that, like Stow, cited Aethicus and Mandeville's Travels and the confusion between the Latin letter u and the Greek letter upsilon (ύψιλον):

Æthicus translated by Saint Ierome, above 1000. yeares since, calleth them Insulas Brutanicas: the Greeks writing it by υψιλον, it soundeth our u. And the Welsh doe the like, as is seene in Brytys, by them pronounced Brutus: Also English Writers that are above an hundred yeares since, call it Brutaine. J. Mandevill.

— William Slatyer, Palæ-Albion, 1621, ode III, canto XIIII, page 81, note b.

One of the Oxford English Dictionary citations of "British Isles" was in 1621 (before the civil wars) by Peter Heylin (or Heylyn) in his Microcosmus: a little description of the great world (a collection of his lectures on historical geography). Writing from his English political perspective, he grouped Ireland with Great Britain and the minor islands with these three arguments:

- The inhabitants of Ireland must have come from Britain as it was the nearest land
- He notes that ancient writers (such as Ptolemy) called Ireland a Brttish Iland
- He cites the observation of the first-century Roman writer Tacitus that the habits and disposition of the people in Ireland were not much unlike the Brittaines

Modern scholarly opinion is that Heylyn "politicised his geographical books Microcosmus ... and, still more, Cosmographie" in the context of what geography meant at that time. Heylyn's geographical work must be seen as political expressions concerned with proving (or disproving) constitutional matters, and "demonstrated their authors' specific political identities by the languages and arguments they deployed." In an era when "politics referred to discussions of dynastic legitimacy, of representation, and of the Constitution ... [Heylyn's] geography was not to be conceived separately from politics."

Geoffrey Keating, in his Foras Feasa ar Éirinn, discussed the mention of druids from the British Isles in Gaul in Julius Caesar's Commentarii de Bello Gallico, suggesting that the island Caesar had in mind was Ireland or Manainn – Anglesey or the Isle of Man. John O'Mahony's 1866 translation was "from the British Isles", as were the translations of John Barlow in 1811 and of Dermod O'Connor in 1723. Patrick S. Dinneen's 1908 edition translates Keating's Irish: ó oiléanaibh na Breatan as "from the islands of Britain".

... agus is móide mheasaim sin mar adeir Caesar san seiseadh leabhar da Stair gurab ó oiléanaibh na Breatan do chuadar draoithe don Fhraingc do bhíodh 'n-a mbreitheamhnaibh aca, agus ag a mbíodh tearmann is saoirse is cádhas ó uaislibh na Fraingce. Is inmheasta gurbh é oiléan na h-Éireann an t-oiléan soin as a thrialladar na draoithe don Fhrainc do bhrígh gur bh' í Éire tobar draoidheachta iarthair Eorpa an tan soin, agus gur bh' í an Ghaedhealg fá teanga do na draoithibh céadna.
… and I hold this view all the more because Cæsar says, in the sixth book of his History, that it was from the islands of Britain that druids went to France, where they became judges, and got termon lands and immunities and honour from the nobles of that country. It is probable that this island whence the druids went to France was the island of Ireland, since Ireland was the fountain of druidism for western Europe at that time, and that accordingly Gaelic was the language of these druids.

— Geoffrey Keating, Foras Feasa ar Éirinn, c. 1634, I.19–20.

Robert Morden, in his 1680 Geography Rectified, introduced his map and chapter detailing the British Isles by noting their political unity under a single monarch but their continued separation into three kingdoms, with each of the British Isles beyond Great Britain and Ireland belonging to one of the three mainland kingdoms.

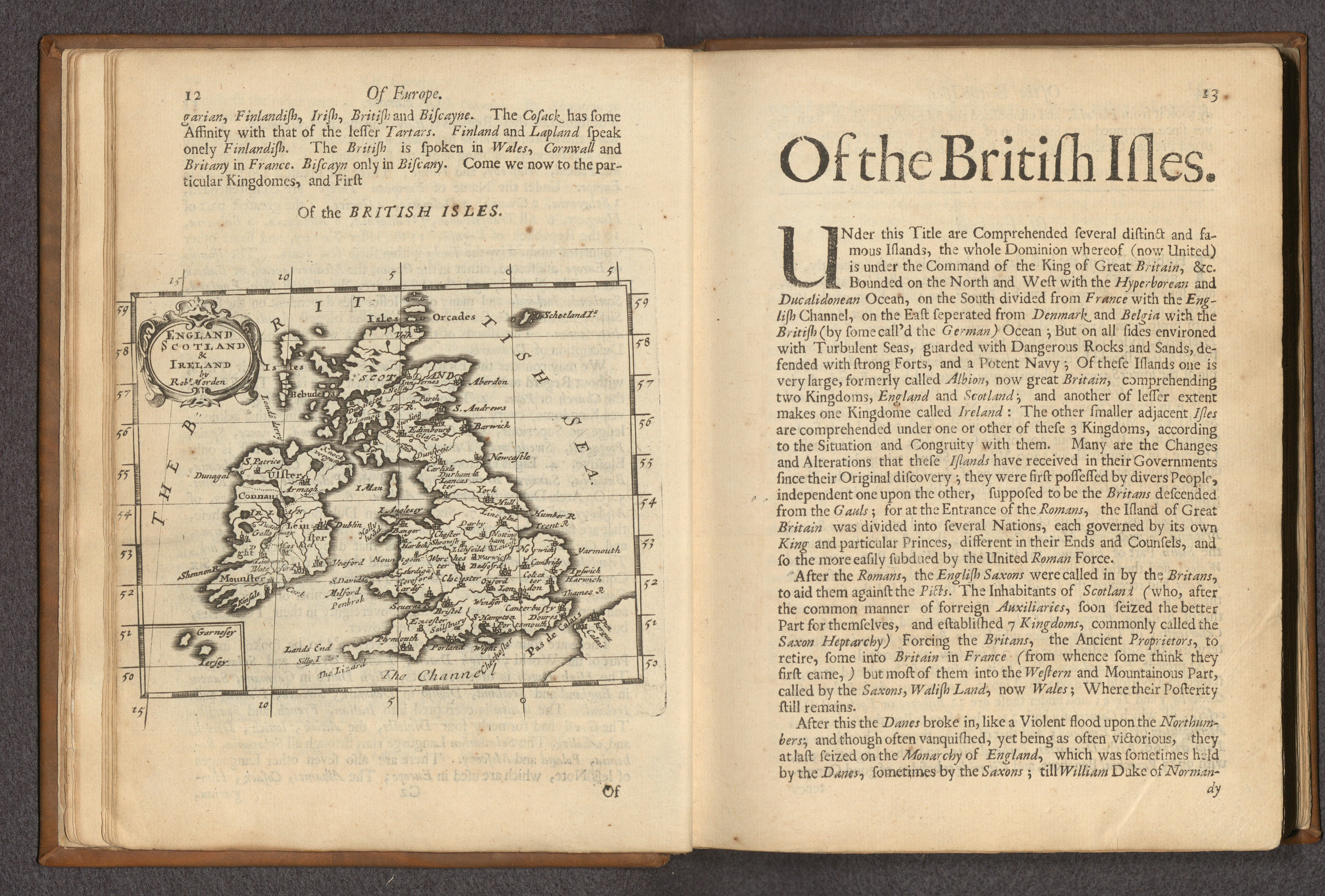
A copy of Robert Morden's map and description of the British Isles, from Geography Rectified, published at London, 1680.

Under this Title are Comprehended several distinct and famous Islands, the whole Dominion whereof (now United) is under the Command of the King of Great Britain, &c. Bounded on the North and West with the Hyperborean and Ducalidonean Ocean, on the South divided from France with the English Channel, on the East separated [sic] from Denmark and Belgia with the British (by some call'd the German) Ocean; But on all sides environed with Turbulent Seas, guarded with Dangerous Rocks and Sands, defended with strong Forts, and a Potent Navy; Of these Islands one is very large, formerly called Albion, now great Britain, comprehending two Kingdoms, England and Scotland; and another of lesser extent makes one Kingdome called Ireland: The other smaller adjacent Isles are comprehended under one or other of these 3 Kingdoms, according to the Situation and Congruity with them.

— Robert Morden, Geography Rectified: or, a Description of the World, 1680, page 13.

Christopher Irvine, in his 1682 Historiae Scoticae Nomenclatura Latino-Vernacula, 'Latin–Vernacular Nomenclature of the History of Scotland', defined Britannice Insulæ [sic] as "The British Islands; which comprehended under them both Albin, Erin, and all the other small islands that are scattered about them".

== Reception ==
=== Perspectives in Great Britain ===
In general, the use of the term British Isles to refer to the archipelago is common and uncontroversial within Great Britain, at least since the concept of "Britishness" was gradually accepted in Britain. In Britain it is commonly understood as being a politically neutral geographical term, although it is sometimes used to refer to the United Kingdom or Great Britain alone. In the 2016 Oxford Dictionary Plus Social Sciences, Howard Sargeant describes the British Isles as "A geographical rather than a political designation".

In 2003, Irish newspapers reported a British Government internal briefing that advised against the use of "British Isles". There is evidence that its use has been increasingly avoided in recent years in fields like cartography and in some academic work, such as Norman Davies's history of Britain and Ireland The Isles: A History. As a purely geographical term in technical contexts (such as geology and natural history), there is less evidence of alternative terms being chosen.

According to Jane Dawson, "Finding an acceptable shorthand geographical description for the countries which formed the UK before the creation of Eire has proved difficult" and in her 2002 work on Mary, Queen of Scots (r. 1542–1567) and Archibald Campbell, 5th Earl of Argyll, she wrote: "for convenience, I have used the following as virtual synonyms: the islands of Britain; these islands; the British Isles, and the adjective, British. Without intending to imply any hidden imperial or other agenda, they describe the kingdoms of Ireland, Scotland, and England and Wales as they existed in the sixteenth century".

In the 2005 Concise Oxford Dictionary of World Place Names, John Everett-Heath defined the British Isles as "Until 1949 a collective title ... In 1949 the Republic of Ireland left the British Commonwealth and so could no longer be included in the title". Everett-Heath used the name in a "general note" and in the introduction to the same work.

In the 2005 preface to the second edition of Hugh Kearney's The British Isles: A History of Four Nations, published in 2006, the historian noted that "The title of this book is 'The British Isles', not 'Britain', in order to emphasise the multi-ethnic character of our intertwined histories. Almost inevitably many within the Irish Republic find it objectionable, much as Basques or Catalans resent the use of the term 'Spain'." and illustrated this by quoting the objection of Irish poet Seamus Heaney to being included in an anthology of British poems. Kearney also wrote: "But what is the alternative to 'The British Isles?' Attempts to encourage the use of such terms as 'The Atlantic Archipelago' and 'The Isles' have met with criticism because of their vagueness. Perhaps one solution is to use 'the British Isles' in inverted commas".

Recognition of issues with the term (as well as problems over definitions and terminology) was discussed by the columnist Marcel Berlins, writing in The Guardian in 2006. Beginning with "At last, someone has had the sense to abolish the British Isles", he opines that "although purely a geographical definition, it is frequently mixed up with the political entities Great Britain, or the United Kingdom. Even when used geographically, its exact scope is widely misunderstood". He also acknowledges that some view the term as representing Britain's imperial past, when it ruled the whole of Ireland.

=== Perspectives in Ireland ===
==== Republic of Ireland ====
From the Irish perspective, some consider "The British Isles" as a political term rather than a geographical name for the archipelago because of the Tudor conquest of Ireland, the subsequent Cromwellian activities in Ireland, the Williamite accession in Britain and the Williamite War in Ireland—all of which resulted in severe impact on the Irish people, landowners and native aristocracy. From that perspective, the term "British Isles" is not a neutral geographical term but an unavoidably political one. Use of the name "British Isles" is sometimes rejected in the Republic of Ireland, while claiming its use implies a primacy of British identity over all the islands outside the United Kingdom, including the Irish state and the Crown dependencies of the Isle of Man and Channel Islands.

J. G. A. Pocock, in a lecture at the University of Canterbury in 1973 and published in 1974: "the term 'British Isles' is one which Irishmen reject and Englishmen decline to take quite seriously". Nicholas Canny, professor of history at the National University of Ireland, Galway between 1979 and 2009, in 2001 described the term as "politically loaded" and stated that he avoided the term in discussion of the reigns following the Union of the Crowns under James VI and I (r. 1603–1625) and Charles I (r. 1625–1649) "not least because this was not a normal usage in the political discourse of the time". Steven G. Ellis, however, Canny's successor as professor of history at the same university from 2009, wrote in 1996: "with regard to terminology, 'the British Isles', as any perusal of contemporary maps will show, was a widely accepted description of the archipelago long before the Union of the Crowns and the completion of the Tudor conquest of Ireland". In the 2004 Brewer's Dictionary of Irish Phrase and Fable, Seán McMahon described "British Isles" as "A geographer's collective description of the islands of Britain and Ireland, but one that is no longer acceptable in the latter country" and "once acceptable" but "seen as politically inflammatory as well as historically inaccurate". The same work describes Powerscourt Waterfall as "the highest in Ireland, and the second highest in the British Isles after Eas a' Chual Aluinn".

Many political bodies, including the Irish government, avoid describing Ireland as being part of the British Isles. The journalist John Gunther, recollecting a meeting in 1936 or 1937 with Éamon de Valera, the president of the Executive Council of the Irish Free State, wrote that the Irish statesman queried his use of the term:

My use of the term "British Isles" was an unconscious little slip. Mr. de Valera did not allow it to go uncorrected. Quite soberly he smiled and said that if I had meant to include Ireland in the British Isles, he trusted that I did so only as a "geographical expression." I explained that my chief duty to my newspaper was to gain knowledge, background, education. "Very well," Mr. de Valera said. "Let your instruction begin at once." And he set out to explain the difference between Ireland and the "British Isles." Some moments later, having again necessity to describe my field of operations, I sought a phrase and said, after a slight pause, "a group of islands in the northern part of Europe." Mr. de Valera sat back and laughed heartily. I hope he will not mind my telling this little story.

— John Gunther, Inside Europe, pp. 373–374

However, the term "British Isles" has been used by individual ministers, as did cabinet minister Síle de Valera when delivering a speech including the term at the opening of a drama festival in 2002, and is used by government departments in relation to geographic topics. In September 2005, Dermot Ahern, minister for foreign affairs, stated in a written answer to a parliamentary question from Caoimhghín Ó Caoláin in Dáil Éireann: "The British Isles is not an officially recognised term in any legal or inter-governmental sense. It is without any official status. The Government, including the Department of Foreign Affairs, does not use this term." Ahern himself continued to use the term, at a conference in April 2015 calling the 2004 Northern Bank robbery "The biggest bank raid in history of the British Isles".

"British Isles" has been used in a geographical sense in Irish parliamentary debates by government ministers, although it is often used in a way that defines the British Isles as excluding the Republic of Ireland.

In October 2006, Irish educational publisher Folens announced that it was removing the term from its popular school atlas effective in January 2007. The decision was made after the issue was raised by a geography teacher. Folens stated that no parent had complained directly to them over the use of "British Isles" and that they had a policy of acting proactively, upon the appearance of a "potential problem". This attracted press attention in the UK and Ireland, during which a spokesman for the Irish Embassy in London said, "'The British Isles' has a dated ring to it, as if we are still part of the Empire". Writing in The Irish Times in 2016, Donald Clarke described the term as "anachronistically named".

A bilingual dictionary website maintained by Foras na Gaeilge translates "British Isles" into Irish as Éire agus an Bhreatain Mhór "Ireland and Great Britain". As the Irish translation of "British Isles", the 1995 Collins Gem Irish Dictionary edited by Séamus Mac Mathúna and Ailbhe Ó Corráin lists Na hOileáin Bhriotanacha, 'British islands'.

==== Northern Ireland ====
Different views on terminology are probably most clearly seen in Northern Ireland (which covers six of the thirty-two counties in Ireland), where the political situation is difficult and national identity contested. In December 1999 at a meeting of the Irish cabinet and Northern Ireland Executive in Armagh. The first minister of Northern Ireland, David Trimble, told the meeting:

This represents the Irish government coming back into a relationship with the rest of the British Isles. We are ending the cold war that has divided not just Ireland but the British Isles. That division is now going to be transformed into a situation where all parts work together again in a way that respects each other.

At a gathering of the British–Irish Inter-Parliamentary Body in 1998, sensitivity about the term became an issue. Referring to plans for the proposed British–Irish Council (supported by both Nationalists and Unionists), the British member of parliament (MP) Dennis Canavan, was paraphrased by official note-takers as having said in a caveat:

He understood that the concept of a Council of the Isles had been put forward by the Ulster Unionists and was referred to as a "Council for the British Isles" by David Trimble. This would cause offence to Irish colleagues; he suggested as an acronym IONA-Islands of the North Atlantic.

In a series of documents issued by the United Kingdom and Ireland, from the Downing Street Declaration to the Good Friday Agreement (Belfast Agreement), relations in the British Isles were referred to as the "East–West strand" of the tripartite relationship.

== Alternative terms ==
There is no single accepted replacement of the term British Isles. However, the terms Great Britain and Ireland, British Isles and Ireland, Islands of the North Atlantic etc. are suggested.

=== British Isles and Ireland ===
The term British Isles and Ireland has been used in a variety of contexts—among others religious, medical, zoologic, academic and others. This form is also used in some book titles and legal publications.

=== Islands of the North Atlantic (or IONA) ===
In the context of the Northern Ireland peace process, the term "Islands of the North Atlantic" (and its acronym, IONA) was a term created by the British MP John Biggs-Davison. It has been used as a term to denote either all the islands, or the two main islands, without referring to the two states.

IONA has been used by (among others) the former Irish Taoiseach (prime minister), Bertie Ahern:

The Government are, of course, conscious of the emphasis that is laid on the East-West dimension by Unionists, and we are, ourselves, very mindful of the unique relationships that exist within these islands – islands of the North Atlantic or IONA as some have termed them.

Others have interpreted the term more narrowly to mean the "Council of the Isles" or "British-Irish Council". British MP Peter Luff told the House of Commons in 1998 that

In the same context, there will be a council of the isles. I think that some people are calling it IONA – the islands of the north Atlantic, from which England, by definition, will be excluded.

His interpretation is not widely shared, particularly in Ireland. In 1997 the leader of the Irish Green Party Trevor Sargent, discussing the Strand Three (or East–West) talks between the Republic of Ireland and the United Kingdom, commented in Dáil Éireann:

I noted with interest the naming of the islands of the north Atlantic under the acronym IONA which the Green Party felt was extremely appropriate.

His comments were echoed by Proinsias De Rossa, then leader of the Democratic Left and later President of the Irish Labour Party, who told the Dáil, "The acronym IONA is a useful way of addressing the coming together of these two islands."

==== Criticism ====
The neologism has been criticised on the grounds that it excludes most of the islands in the North Atlantic.

The name is also ambiguous, because of the other islands in the North Atlantic which have never been considered part of the British Isles.

=== West European Isles ===
The name "West European Isles" is one translation of the islands' name in the Gaelic languages of Irish and Manx, with equivalent terms for "British Isles".

In Old Icelandic, the name of the British Isles was Vestrlönd, 'the Western lands'. The name of a person from the British Isles was a Vestmaðr, 'a man from the West'.

=== Other terms ===
Alternative names include "Britain and Ireland", the "Atlantic Archipelago", the "Anglo-Celtic Isles", and the "British-Irish Isles".

==== These islands ====
Common among Irish public officials, although as a deictic label it cannot be used outside the islands in question. Charles Haughey referred to his 1980 discussions with Margaret Thatcher on "the totality of relationships in these islands"; the 1998 Good Friday Agreement also uses "these islands" and not "British Isles". In Brewer's Dictionary of Irish Phrase and Fable, McMahon writes that this is "cumbersome but neutral" and "the phrase in most frequent use" but that it is "cute and unsatisfactory". In documents drawn up jointly between the British and Irish governments, the archipelago is referred to simply as "these islands".

==== Insular ====
An adjective, meaning "island based", used as a qualifier in cultural history up to the early medieval period, as for example insular art, insular script, Insular Celtic, Insular Christianity.

==== Atlantic Archipelago ====
J. G. A. Pocock, in his lecture of 1973 entitled "British history: a Plea for a new subject" and published in 1974, introduced the historiographical concept of the "Atlantic archipelago – since the term 'British Isles' is one which Irishmen reject and Englishmen decline to take quite seriously". It has been adopted by some historians. According to Steven G. Ellis, in 1996 professor of history at the National University of Ireland, Galway, "to rename the British Isles as 'the Atlantic archipelago' in deference to Irish nationalist sensibilities seems an extraordinary price to pay, particularly when many Irish historians have no difficulty with the more historical term." According to Jane Dawson in 2002, "Whilst accurate, the term 'Atlantic archipelago' is rather cumbersome".

The name Atlantic Isles is used in some works, for example, Diarmaid MacCulloch's The Reformation: A History.

==== Hibernian Archipelago ====
Another suggestion is "Hibernian Archipelago". In Brewer's Dictionary of Irish Phrase and Fable, McMahon calls this title "cumbersome and inaccurate".

== See also ==
- Macedonia naming dispute
