= Islands of the North Atlantic =

Acronym for the British Isles

IONA (Islands of the North Atlantic) is an acronym suggested in 1980 by Sir John Biggs-Davison to refer to a loose linkage of the Channel Islands (Guernsey and Jersey), Great Britain (England, Scotland, and Wales), Ireland (Northern Ireland and the Republic of Ireland), and the Isle of Man, similar to the present day British–Irish Council. Its intended purpose was as a more politically acceptable alternative to the British Isles, which is disliked by some people in Ireland.

The neologism has been criticised on the grounds that it excludes most of the islands in the North Atlantic, and also that the only island referred to by the term that is actually in the North Atlantic Ocean is Ireland (Great Britain is in fact in between the Irish Sea and The North Sea). In the context of the Northern Irish peace process, during the negotiation of the Good Friday Agreement, IONA was unsuccessfully proposed as a neutral name for the proposed council.

One feature of this name is that IONA has the same spelling as the island of Iona which is off the coast of Scotland, but with which Irish people have strong cultural associations. It is therefore a name with which people of both main islands might identify. Taoiseach Bertie Ahern noted the symbolism in a 2006 address in Edinburgh:

[The Island of] Iona is a powerful symbol of relationships between these islands, with its ethos of service not dominion. Iona also radiated out towards the Europe of the Dark Ages, not to mention Pagan England at Lindisfarne. The British-Irish Council is the expression of a relationship that at the origin of the Anglo-Irish process in 1981 was sometimes given the name Iona, islands of the North Atlantic, and sometimes Council of the Isles, with its evocation of the Lords of the Isles of the 14th and 15th centuries who spanned the North Channel. In the 17th century, Highland warriors and persecuted Presbyterian Ministers criss-crossed the North Channel.

In a Dáil Éireann debate, Proinsias De Rossa was less enthusiastic:

The acronym IONA is a useful way of addressing the coming together of these two islands. However, the island of Iona is probably a green heaven in that nobody lives on it and therefore it cannot be polluted in any way.

The term IONA is used by the World Universities Debating Championship. IONA is one of the regions that appoint a representative onto the committee of the World Universities Debating Council. Greenland, the Faroe Islands and Iceland are included in the definition of IONA used in this context, while Newfoundland and Prince Edward Island are in the North American region. However, none of these islands have yet participated in the World Universities Debating Championships. Otherwise, the term has achieved very little popular usage in any context.

== See also ==
- Names of the British Isles
- Terminology of the British Isles
