= Jane Dawson =

British historian

Jane Elizabeth Anne Dawson is a British academic and historian. Her specialism is early modern history within the British Isles and the Protestant Reformation.

Dawson is Professor Emerita of Reformation history at the University of Edinburgh and has previously served as a lecturer and honorary lecturer in modern history at the University of St Andrews.

== Career ==
Dawson completed her BA and PhD in History at the University of Durham. In 1977 she became the first Glenfiddich Fellow in Scottish History at the University of St Andrews.

In 1979 Dawson began a postgraduate teaching qualification at the University of Dundee and Dundee College for Education. Following this, Dawson took on a temporary post as teacher of history at Bell Baxter High School in Cupar, Fife. In 1982, Dawson entered a number of tutoring and lecturing positions within Scottish and Modern History within the University of St Andrews and from 1990 to 1992 held the position of honorary lecturer.

She remained the only female lecturer of Modern History during her time at the University of St Andrews.

In 1991, Dawson took up the position of the John Laing Lecturer within the School of Divinity at the University of Edinburgh and became Professor of Reformation History in 2007. She continues to serve as Professor Emerita of Reformation History at the University of Edinburgh.

Dawson's research encompasses the creation of two editions of manuscript letters Clan Campbell Letters, 1559–1583; as well as a general history of Scotland during the long sixteenth century entitled Scotland Re-formed, 1488–1587.

Most recently, Dawson has published a definitive biography of the life of John Knox in 2015 in which she challenges traditional stereotypes which label the religious reformer as insular and misogynistic.

== Later life ==
Dawson retired from lecturing in 2017 but remains as Professor Emerita of Reformation History at the University of Edinburgh. She continues to be actively engaged in research focusing on Scottish history.

== Notable publications ==
- "Richt honorabill ladies: Noble Power and Aristocratic Women in Sixteenth-Century Scotland", The Scottish Historical Review, 103:3 (December 2024), pp. 361–391. doi:10.3366/shr.2024.0680
- "James and John: The Stormy Relationship between James Stewart, Regent Moray, and John Knox", Steven J. Reid, Rethinking the Renaissance and Reformation (Boydell, 2024). doi:10.1017/9781805432210.009
- John Knox Yale University Press (9 April 2015)
- Scotland Re-formed: 1488–1587 New Edinburgh History of Scotland Volume 6, (Edinburgh, EUP, 2007 & reprint 2010, 2011, 2012)
- Campbell Letters, 1559–83 (Scottish History Society, 5th ser. Vol 10, Edinburgh, 1997).
- Breadalbane Letters, 1548–83 (on-line 2004) Updated 2007.
- The Politics of Religion in the age of Mary, Queen of Scots: The Earl of Argyll and the struggle for Britain and Ireland, (Studies in Early Modern British History, Cambridge University Press, Cambridge, 2002)
- "Two Kingdoms or Three? Ireland in Anglo-Scottish Relations", Roger Mason, Scotland and England (Edinburgh: John Donald, 1987), pp. 113–138.
