= Boundless (2022 TV series) =

Spanish television series

- Official release poster
- Spanish: Sin límites
- Genre: Historical drama
- Screenplay by: Patxi Amezcua
- Directed by: Simon West
- Starring: Rodrigo Santoro; Álvaro Morte; Sergio Peris-Mencheta; Carlos Cuevas; Adrián Lastra; Pepón Nieto; Bárbara Goenaga; Raúl Tejón; Gonçalo Diniz; Manuel Morón
- Country of origin: Spain
- Original languages: Spanish; Portuguese
- No. of seasons: 1
- No. of episodes: 6

Production
- Production companies: RTVE; Amazon Prime Video; MONO Films; KILIMA Media

Original release
- Network: Amazon Prime Video
- Release: 10 June – 17 June 2022

Boundless (Spanish: Sin límites) is a Spanish historical drama adventure miniseries directed by Simon West that premiered on 10 June 2022. It stars Álvaro Morte and Rodrigo Santoro as Juan Sebastián Elcano and Ferdinand Magellan respectively. It was created on the 500th anniversary of the First Circumnavigation of the World.

== Plot ==
The plot is a fictionalised account of the First Circumnavigation of the World, tracking the 1519–22 voyage initiated by Ferdinand Magellan and completed by Juan Sebastián Elcano.

== Cast ==
- Rodrigo Santoro as Ferdinand Magellan, a Portuguese explorer and captain of the Trinidad
- Álvaro Morte as Juan Sebastián Elcano, a Spanish explorer
- Niccolò Senni as Antonio Pigafetta, a Venetian explorer
- Bárbara Goenaga as Beatriz, Magellan's wife
- Gonçalo Diniz as Duarte Barbosa, a Portuguese explorer and Beatriz's brother
- Sergio Peris-Mencheta as Juan de Cartagena, a Spanish aristocrat and captain of the San Antonio
- Adrián Lastra as Luis de Mendoza, a Spanish explorer and captain of the Victoria
- Kepa Errasti as Gaspar de Quesada, a Spanish explorer and captain of the Concepción
- Machi Salgado as Juan Rodríguez Serrano, a Spanish explorer and captain of the Santiago
- Raúl Tejón as Gonzalo Gómez de Espinosa, a Spanish explorer
- Xosé A. Touriñán as Álvaro de Mezquita, a Portuguese explorer
- Carlos Scholz as Charles V, King of Spain and Holy Roman Emperor
- Manuel Morón as Cardinal Fonseca
- Colin Ryan as Enrique of Malacca, a Malay slave
- Pedro Bachura as Omar, a sailor from Madeira
- Dídac Calpe as Juan, a Spanish cabin boy
- Pepón Nieto as Padre Bartolomé
- Carlos Cuevas as Martino
- Mario Toñanez as Chief of the Guaraní
- Jason Asuncion as Humabón, chief of Cebu
- Armando Alera as Lapulapu, chief of Mactan

== Episodes ==
No.	Title	Directed by	Written by	Original release date
1	"Mi rey no ha querido verme (My king did not wish to see me)"	Simon West	Patxi Amezcua	10 June 2022
2	"Te buscan por traición (You are wanted for treason)"	Simon West	Patxi Amezcua	10 June 2022
3	"La rebelión está castigada con la muerte (The punishment for rebellion is death)"	Simon West	Patxi Amezcua	17 June 2022
4	"Las ballenas no nadan en ríos (Whales don't swim in rivers)"	Simon West	Patxi Amezcua	17 June 2022
5	"Os han elegido como capitán (You have been chosen as captain)"	Simon West	Patxi Amezcua	17 June 2022
6	"Son vientos del este (Winds from the east)"	Simon West	Patxi Amezcua	17 June 2022

== Production ==
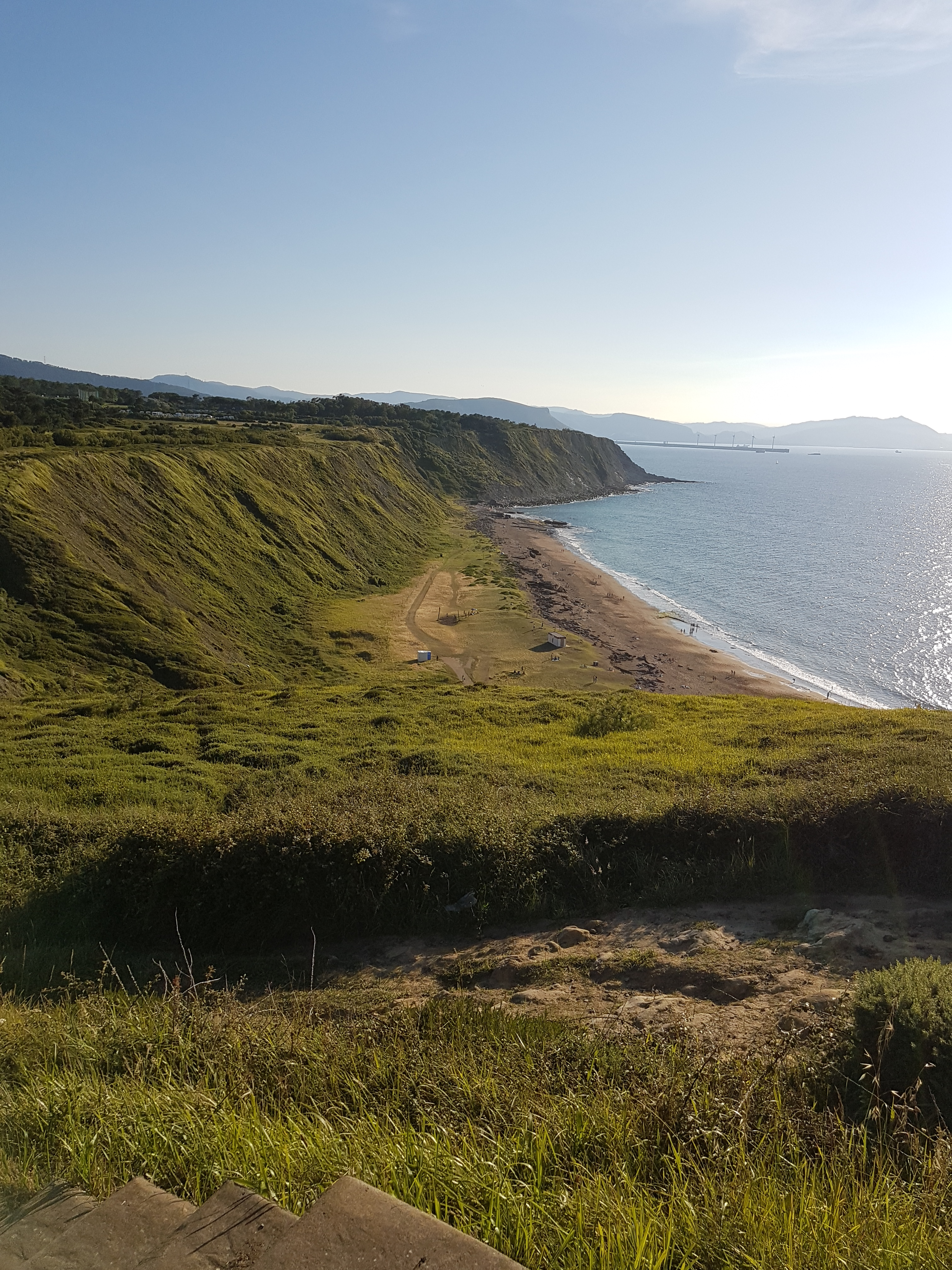
Footage was shot at the Azkorri beach

The project is the result of the collaboration agreement signed by RTVE and the Spanish Ministry of Defence in March 2018. RTVE and Amazon Prime Video unveiled the project in February 2020. Simon West was announced as director, and MONO Films and KILIMA Media as production companies. The screenplay was written by Patxi Amezcua. Several cast members were disclosed on 22 April 2021. The series consists of 6 episodes each with a running time of around 40 minutes, with a total budget of €20 million. Production began filming in Olite, Navarre, on 26 April 2021. Shooting locations also included the Azkorri beach in Getxo, Biscay, and the Dominican Republic. According to Amezcua, the most important historical license in the screenplay was bringing Magellan and Elcano together on the same ship.

To add autenthicity, Simon West decided that the characters should speak in their own native languages, as opposed to everybody speaking English with an accent. Accordingly, most of the dialogues are in Spanish, but several characters speak in Portuguese, and the series portrays Malayo-Polynesian languages as well.

== Release ==
Amazon Prime Video scheduled an exclusive premiere in Spain and Latin America for 10 June 2022.
