= Elcano & Magellan: The First Voyage Around the World =

- Film poster
- Spanish: Elcano y Magallanes. La primera vuelta al mundo
- Directed by: Ángel Alonso
- Written by: José Antonio Vitoria; Garbiñe Losana
- Produced by: Ricardo Ramón
- Starring: Kiko Jáuregui; Iñaki Beraetxe; Aintzane Krujeiras; José Vera; Ander Vildósola Gala; Kandido Uranga
- Music by: Joseba Beristain
- Production companies: Dibulitoon Studio; Elkano Dibulitoon AIE
- Distributed by: Barton Films; Filmax
- Release dates: 23 March 2019 (Málaga); 5 July 2019 (Spain)
- Running time: 90 minutes
- Country: Spain
- Languages: Spanish; Basque; English

Elcano & Magellan: The First Voyage Around the World ( Spanish: Elcano y Magallanes: La primera vuelta al mundo;Basque: Elkano, lehen mundu bira; Portuguese: Elcano e Magalhães: A Primeira Volta ao Mundo) is a 2019 Spanish animated adventure film directed by Ángel Alonso and written by José Antonio Vitoria and Garbiñe Losana. The film retells the story of 1519 circumnavigation led by Portuguese explorer Ferdinand Magellan and Spanish navigator Juan Sebastián Elcano.

Elcano & Magellan: The First Voyage Around the World premiered at the 2019 Málaga Film Festival on 23 March 2019, and was released in Spain on July 5, during the 500th anniversary of the expedition. The film was made controversial in the Philippines for its inaccurate portrayal of the Filipino natives, especially Lapulapu, who led the Battle of Mactan that killed Magellan. At the 34th Goya Awards, it earned a nomination for Best Animated Film.

The OST "Confía en el Viento" was sung by La Oreja De Van Gogh.

== Plot ==
Set in Seville, Andalusia in 1519, Juan Sebastián Elcano is a young and irresponsible man who wants to live as a captain of his little boat, but due to debts that he has with the city's bank, the bank manager confiscates Elcano's boat and orders the guards to arrest him as a defaulter.

As he tries to avoid imprisonment, Elcano enlists as part of an expedition of five ships commanded by Portuguese explorer Ferdinand Magellan, nicknamed "The Navigator", in order to arrive in the Moluccas Islands to get spices, very valuable to the ruling Kingdom of Castile.

Portuguese ambassador Álvaro da Costa plots to make the journey a failure since the Moluccas Islands belong to the Kingdom of Portugal, and hires Yago as spy and saboteur to prevent the journey's success. Unaware of it, Magellan completes the crew of the five ships: the Trinidad, the San Antonio, the Concepción, the Santiago, and the Victoria; and starts the journey.

Elcano, hoping to have his own ship, works as a helmsman for Captain Juan de Cartagena, who despises him and is suspicious about Magellan, taking him as a traitor who secretly works for Portugal. At the same time that Yago makes some sabotages, Cartagena conspires with the other captains to get Magellan's secret map to navigate by unknown lands. But after Magellan died after a battle with natives of the Saint Lazarus islands, Elcano is promoted by the crew as the new leader of the trip.

Travelling to the west following the sun and determined to fulfill the mission, Elcano finds himself fighting against not only Yago and Álvaro da Costa, but time and starvation to make history and give the first trip around the world.

== Voice cast ==
Character	Actor	
Character	Spanish	English
Juan Sebastián Elcano	Kiko Jáuregui	Rio Chavarro
Ferdinand Magellan	Iñaki Beraetxe	Chris Jahn
Samar	Aintzane Krujeiras	Betsy Durkin
Paco	José Vera	Avi Hoffman
Antonio Pigafetta	Ander Vildósola Gala	Roly Gutiérrez
Álvaro da Costa	Kandido Uranga	Oscar Cheda
Yago	Xavier Alkiza	Alex Machado
Enrique of Malacca	Jon Samaniego	Aaron Goldenberg
Gonzalo de Espinosa	Martín Zabala	Paul Louis
Juan de Cartagena	Mañu Elizondo	Avi Hoffman
Juan de Serrano	Jesús Izeta	David Kwiat
Gaspar de Quesada	Mikel Fernández	Paul Tei
King of Cebú	Kiko Jáuregui	
Almanzor	Mikel Fernández	
Gómez	Asier Hernández	Alex Texeira
Elcano's Friend	Eduardo Gorriño	Roly Gutiérrez
Inés	Vito Rogado	Amanda Williams
Banker	Ramón Zalakain	Terry Hardcastle
Governor of the Moluccas	Ramón Zalakain	Travis Roig

== Release ==
The film was screened on 23 March 2019 during the Málaga Film Festival. It was later released in Spain by Barton Films and Filmax on 5 July 2019, on the 500th anniversary of the circumnavigation. The film was also released in countries such as Kuwait, Lebanon, Poland, Portugal, Russia, Turkey, and Vietnam.

== Controversy ==
In November 2019, the film sparked online controversy in the Philippines for glorifying colonialism and its historical inaccuracies, including the clothes worn by the indigenous Filipino natives in the film and its antagonistic portrayal of Lapulapu and the natives, despite Filipino historians challenging Lapulapu's role in the Battle of Mactan as being only the chieftain and not the one who actually killed Magellan. Some Twitter users also pointed out the similarities of the characters' designs to those of the 2000 American animated film The Road to El Dorado, the 2010 Disney Animated Musical Tangled and the 2016 Disney Animated Musical Moana.

An online petition was set on Change.org, calling for the movie to be banned for release in the Philippines. The petition garnered more than 4,000 signatures in its first hours. Agusan del Norte's First District Representative Lawrence Fortun called for the film to be reviewed by both historians and the Movie and Television Review and Classification Board before it could be released in Philippine cinemas.

Despite the criticism the film received on social media, the National Historical Commission of the Philippines stated that, while the commission does not endorse or critique films or any other art form in particular, the film is an opportunity for the Filipino public to learn more about their ancestors, noting that both Spain and the Philippines have biases towards the Magellan-Elcano expedition. In a statement, the commission's chairperson Rene Escalante said: "What we request the public is to be critical and make use of the opportunity to discover by themselves who truly were our ancestors, by reading books about Philippine history, culture, and society, or visiting the National Museum and other museums and galleries alike."

In response to the calls for the film's ban, Filipino historian Xiao Chua stated that the producers should be allowed to exhibit the film without suffering from censorship. The Malacañang Palace said that it is up to the Movie and Television Review and Classification Board to decide if the film should be either edited or banned in the Philippines.

In response to the film's online backlash, the film's Philippine distributor, Crystal Sky Multimedia, stated that it invited historians, members of the academe and film experts to "re-evaluate" the film.

== Accolades ==
Award	Date of ceremony	Category	Result
Cinema Writers Circle Awards, Spain	20 January 2020	CEC Award; Best Animated Film	Nominated
Goya Awards	25 January 2020	Best Animated Film	Nominated
Platino Awards	29 June 2020	Best Animated Film	Nominated

== See also ==
- List of Spanish films of 2019
