= Conquistadores: Adventvm =

Spanish TV series

- Poster
- Starring: Aitana Sánchez-Gijón; Juan Díaz Pardeiro; Denis Gómez; Miguel Lago; Mauro Muñiz de Urquiza
- No. of episodes: 8

Release
- Original network: #0
- Original release: October 9 – November 27, 2017

Conquistadores: Adventvm is a 2017 Spanish historical drama miniseries directed by Israel del Santo for Movistar+ and starring Aitana Sánchez-Gijón, Juan Díaz Pardeiro, Denis Gómez, Miguel Lago and Mauro Muñiz de Urquiza.

It tells the story of the first 30 years of the colonization of the Americas by Christopher Columbus. It was filmed in Brazil, Burgos, Cantabria and Cádiz.

== Cast ==
- Eduardo San Juan as Juan Rodríguez de Fonseca
- Nacho Acero as Gonzalo Guerrero
- Eduardo Ruiz as Fernando de Aragón
- Paco Illescas as Pánfilo de Narváez
- César Díaz Capilla as Captain Enciso
- Roberto Bonacini as Alonso de Ojeda
- José Sisenando as Francisco Pizarro
- Alfonso Delgado as Pedrarias Dávila
- Mario de la Rosa as Juan de la Cosa
- Rubén Tejerina as Gonzalo Gómez de Espinosa
- Kike Inchausti as Bernardino de Talavera
- Miguel Lago Casal as Cristóbal Colón
- Miguel Díaz Espada as Hernán Cortes
- Juan Díaz Pardeiro as Antonio Pigafetta
- Denis Gómez as Fernando Magallanes
- Paco Manzanedo as Vasco Núñez de Balboa
- Mauro Muñiz as Juan Sebastián Elcano
- Lucas Palomino as a soldier of Magallanes
- Sandra Peixoto as Anacaona
- Aitana Sánchez-Gijón as Isabel de Castilla
- Aitor Legardón as Cabeza de Vaca
- Jon Bermúdez as Luis de Mendoza
- Diego Recua as Juan de Cartagena
- Urko Aguirre as Peru de Echevarria
- Diego Barrero as Gerónimo de Aguilar
- Pau Carreres as Ponce de León
- Hugo Huerta as Alonso el Negro
- Alex Lima as Pankiak
- Caroline Nunes as Anauyansi
- Gerivaldo Oliveira as Enrique
- Ramón Pallicé as Captain Márquez
- Bruno Squarcia as Américo Vespucio
- David Ambit as Nicolás de Ovando
- Lorenzo Andrino as a soldier of Balboa
- Alejandro Bernardez as Bartolomé Torres
- Jorge Cabrera as Urtubia
- Jerôme Debève as French councillor
- Ayoub El Hilali as Abu Ben Saif
- José Gonçalo Pais as Portuguese Captain
- Alberto Jo Lee as Rajá Zuzú
- Hermes Sánchez-Gijón López as young soldier
- Matteo Mariotti as Italian councillor
- Álvaro Martín as soldier Clavijo
- Alejandro Morales as the Ovando's messenger
- Francisco Ortiz as Hernando de Soto
- Erika Sanz as Isabel de Bobadilla
- Luis Sánchez-Gijón as the soldier Aguado
- Anderson Tariano as Caonabó
- Ahmed Younoussi
- Alejandro Ruiz Río as King Fernando
- Iker Legardon as Gaspar de Quesada

== Episodes ==
No.	Title	Directed by	Original release date
1	"Las llaves del mar"	Israel del Santo	October 9, 2017
2	"El pequeño capitán"	Israel del Santo	October 16, 2017
3	"La Caprichosa"	Israel del Santo	October 23, 2017
4	"Océanos de oro"	Israel del Santo	October 30, 2017
5	"Huérfanos"	Israel del Santo	November 6, 2017
6	"Gigantes"	Israel del Santo	November 13, 2017
7	"Te llamarás Pacífico"	Israel del Santo	November 20, 2017
8	"El primero en rodearme"	Israel del Santo	November 27, 2017
