= Luis de Mendoza =

Luis de Mendoza may refer to:

- Luis de Mendoza (explorer), a member of Magellan's expedition
- Luis Hurtado de Mendoza, 2nd Marquess of Mondéjar, a Spanish nobleman
