= Álvaro de Mezquita =

Álvaro de Mezquita (also called Álvaro de Mesquita) was a Portuguese sailor and nephew of Ferdinand Magellan.

== Biography ==
He was a supernumerary in the Magellan expedition, originally sailing on the ship Trinidad, and was made captain of the ship San Antonio in place of Juan de Cartagena, who had been arrested by Magellan for insubordination. Juan de Cartagena was later banished for treason and marooned by Magellan at the San Julian Bay, in present day Santa Cruz Province, Argentina. In 1520 Mezquita was deposed by a mutiny on the San Antonio led by the pilot Esteban Gómez. Gómez had disagreed with Mezquita as to the correct course of action after the San Antonio became separated from the rest of the fleet. After seizing command of the ship, Gómez imprisoned Mezquita and took the ship back to Spain.

On the return journey, San Antonio sighted the Falkland Islands, which were christened the "islas de San Antón" in honor of the ship. This hypothesis has been supported by the European cartography of the 16th century, whose labels for the islands progressively evolved through "San Antón", "S. Antón", "S.Antón", "Santón", "Sansón", and "San són", and by the research of the Uruguayan historian Rolando Laguarda Trías, who found documentation in the Bibliothèque nationale de France which narrated the testimony of eyewitnesses of the sighting.

Upon returning to Spain, Mezquita was imprisoned along with the rest of the crew of the San Antonio while their case was adjudicated by Juan Rodríguez de Fonseca. Gómez's mutiny was ruled to have been justified, and Mezquita remained imprisoned while the rest of the crew were released. He was released from prison in 1522, upon the return of the Victoria, the only surviving ship of the Magellan expedition.

== Bibliography ==
- Fernández de Navarrete, Eustaquio (1872). Historia de Juan Sebastian del Cano. Vitoria: Imprenta de los hijos de Manteli.
- Laguarda Trías, Rolando A. (1983). "Nave Española descubre las islas Malvinas en 1520". C. De la Academia de Marinha de Lisboa, del Instituto Histórico e Geografico Brasileiro y de la Real Sociedad Geográfica de Madrid. Montevideo.
