= Andrés de San Martín =

Andrés de San Martín (? in Seville – 1521 in Cebu) was the chief pilot-cosmographer (astrologer) of the Armada del Maluco, the fleet commanded by Ferdinand Magellan in 1519. He is presumed to have died during that expedition in Cebu.

== Family ==
Archival records published in 1997 show San Martín was born in Seville. He was the son of Juan de Logroño and Juana Hernández. He had at least one brother, Cristóbal de San Martín, who was his heir. Andrés de San Martín had two daughters, Juana and María, with his partner Ana Martín, whom he never married.

== Exceptional pilot of the Renaissance ==
Little is known of San Martín's life before 1512, when King Ferdinand commissioned him royal pilot.

His knowledge of cosmography (astrology) was singular. He knew more than others during the Age of Discovery how astronomical science could be applied to navigation. Confident of his unique skills he applied for the post of Pilot Major of Spain upon the death in 1512 of its holder, Amerigo Vespucci. He was turned down by the King who appointed instead Juan Díaz de Solís. He again applied for the post in 1518, Díaz de Solís having died in 1516. Again he was turned down in favor of another foreigner, Sebastian Cabot. Nevertheless, the King consoled San Martín by raising his pay to 10,000 maravedis.

San Martín replaced Rui Faleiro as cosmographer/astrologer on Magellan's expedition to the Spice Islands. Magellan and his Portuguese countryman Faleiro had planned the expedition together, but when the latter developed mental problems the king removed him from the enterprise. San Martín reported for duty upon order of the King sometime in July 1519. He received advances on July 31, 1519 of 30,000 maravedis and 7,500 maravedis for cost-of-living allowance.

At Rio de Janeiro, San Martín left the ship San Antonio and transferred to Victoria. He was suspected of being involved in the failed mutiny attempt in April 1520 in Port St. Julian and was tortured by strappado, but afterwards was allowed to continue his service as cosmographer.

San Martín was presumed death at Cebu on May 1, 1521. There is no certainty he was one of those killed there. There were reliable reports later that some eight survived the massacre.

== Measurement of longitude ==
Andrés de San Martín, according to Tim Joyner, was the most eminent cosmographer in the fleet. Twice, he was able to calculate accurately, using astronomical measurement, the longitudes of two places, Port San Julian at Patagonia and Homonhon Island in the Philippines. At San Julian, he brought out his instruments, to quote Tim Joyner, "to test Faleiro's system for using conjunctions of the moon with the planets to determine longitude. His measurements resulted in the astonishingly accurate estimate of 61° west of Seville. Less than one degree in error, this was an accomplishment far beyond the capabilities of the other pilots."

Again, at Homonhon Island, in central Philippines, he was able to measure its longitude, according to Rolando Laguarda Trías. Laguarda asserts that the reading of 189° longitude "from the meridian" which meant the line of demarcation at 47° west of Greenwich. In today's system of reckoning Homonhon Is. is at 125° 42.8' east longitude. This reading is only two degrees in error, Laguarda asserts. No other had shown such mathematical skill. Indeed, for two hundred years his calculations were not matched by anyone.

== San Martín's papers ==
San Martín entrusted his priceless navigational notes and other papers to Ginés de Mafra sometime before May 1, 1521. These were confiscated when de Mafra together with co-prisoners Gómez de Espinosa and Hans Vargue reached Lisbon in July 1526. This lengthy possession by de Mafra of San Martín's papers has led to the belief voiced by geographer Donald D. Brand and embraced by Magellan historiographer Martin Torodash, who is cited by Philippine religious historian John Schummacher, S.J., for Brand's dictum, that the eyewitness account of Ginés de Mafra is nothing more than his recall of what he read from San Martín's papers. This has led to historians overall disregarding the testimony of de Mafra which has overarching importance in Age of Discovery geography of the Philippine region.

In fact, because de Mafra's observations may reflect as well the genius of San Martín, his testimony becomes doubly important. De Mafra's account, more precisely, is critical and indispensable in solving the Mazaua landfall issue which is also known in the Philippines as the 'First mass in the Philippines' controversy.

San Martín's papers were kept at a Lisbon archive where these were consulted by Portuguese historians like Fernão Lopes de Castanheda, Gaspar Correia, Damião de Góis, João de Barros, and others.

San Martín's papers were later transferred to Madrid during the union of the Iberian kingdoms, 1580-1640. Antonio de Herrera y Tordesillas, as asserted by J. Denucé, extensively used San Martín's insights. One of the key observations of the astrologer pertaining the March–April 1521 incident at the island-port of Mazaua remained the sole faithful published account throughout the 16th century until the 19th century with the exact name of the island. Other accounts had either "Messana" or "Massana" as the island's name. These two names were first used by Maximilianus Transylvanus in his report of the circumnavigation contained in a letter to Cardinal Matthäus Lang, the archbishop of Salzburg. Transylvanus' report was published and became an overnight sensation in Europe. San Martín's papers unfortunately got lost and are nowhere to be found. They exist in the various quotes by contemporary Portuguese historians and later Spanish historians like Herrera.
