= Magellan expedition =

16th-century Spanish maritime expedition

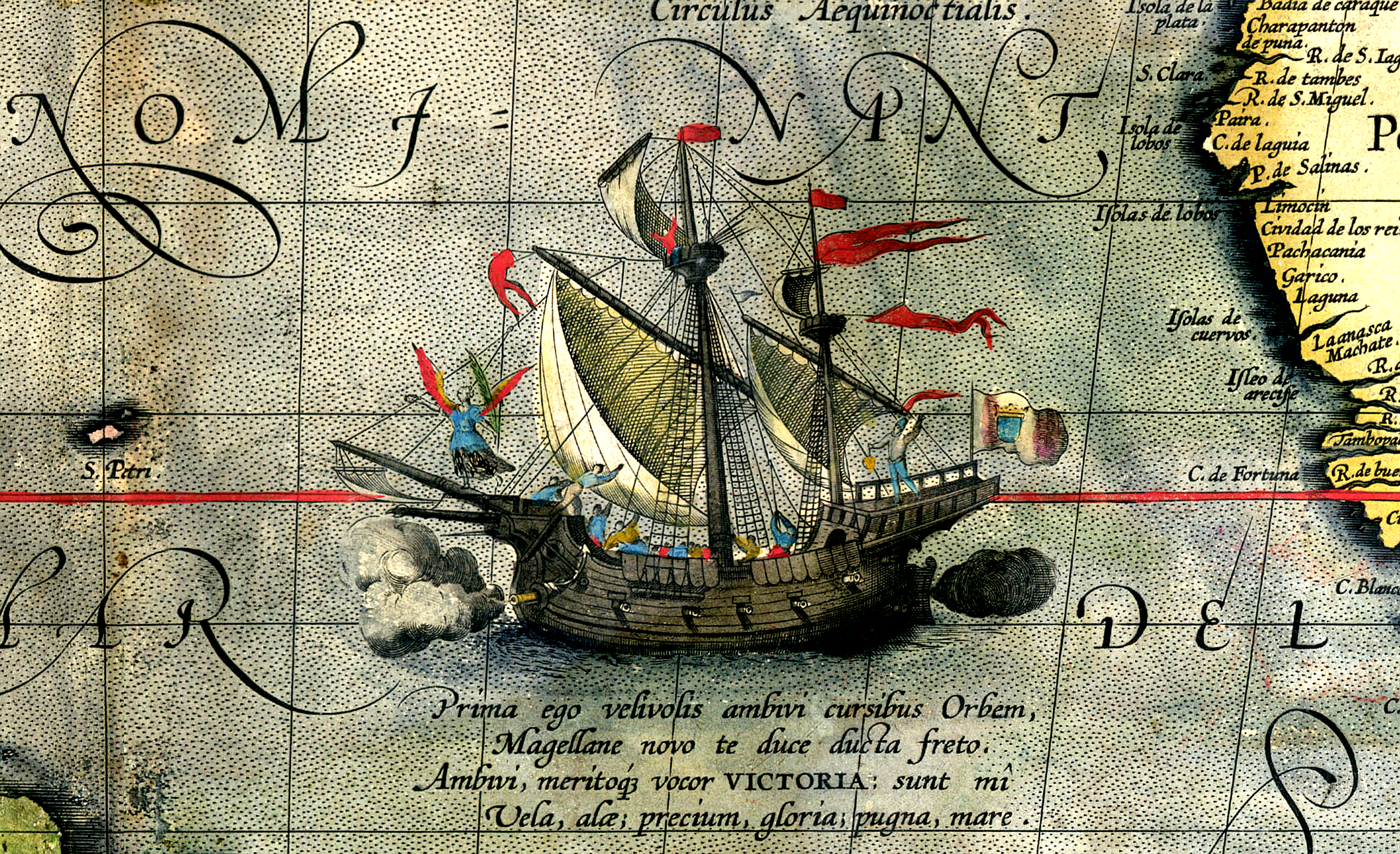
- Nao Victoria, the only ship in the fleet to complete the circumnavigation. Detail from a map by Abraham Ortelius, 1590.
- Country: Spain
- Leader: Juan Sebastián Elcano; Duarte Barbosa and Juan Serrano (Note: Served as co-commanders after Magellan's death. Barbosa was Magellan's brother-in-law); João Carvalho; Martin Mendez; Ferdinand Magellan
- Start: Sanlúcar de Barrameda 20 September 1519; 507 years ago
- End: Sanlúcar de Barrameda 6 September 1522; 504 years ago
- Goal: Find a western maritime route to the Spice Islands
- Ships: Trinidad; San Antonio; Concepción; Victoria; Santiago
- Crew: Approx. 270
- Survivors: 18 returned with Elcano; 12 were captured by the Portuguese in Cape Verde, 55 returned with the San Antonio in 1521, and 4 (or 5) from Trinidad returned after hard labor in the East Indies
- Achievements: First circumnavigation of Earth (completed by Elcano after Magellan's death); First Pacific crossing; First to navigate from the Atlantic to the Pacific; First documented European contact with the Philippines

Route
- Route taken by the expedition, with milestones marked

The Magellan–Elcano expedition was a 16th-century Spanish expedition planned and initially led by Portuguese explorer Ferdinand Magellan and completed by the Spanish navigator Juan Sebastián Elcano which resulted in the first circumnavigation of the Earth. Its purpose was to secure a maritime trade route with the Moluccas, or Spice Islands, in present-day Indonesia. The expedition departed Spain in 1519 and returned there in 1522 under the command of Elcano, who continued the voyage after Magellan's death in the Philippines. One of the most significant voyages in the Age of Discovery, the nearly three-year expedition totaled 60,440 km (37,560 mi) and was the first to sail around the earth. It also marked the first crossing of the Pacific by a European expedition, revealing the vast scale of that ocean, and proved that ships could sail around the world on a western sea route.

The five-ship fleet left Spain on 20 September 1519 with about 270 men. After crossing the Atlantic Ocean, the ships continued south along the eastern coast of South America. Entering the Strait of Magellan on 1 November 1520, the fleet passed through to the Pacific Ocean, which Magellan himself named Mar Pacifico. The fleet crossed the Pacific in 98 days, stopped in Guam and the Philippines, and successfully reached the Moluccas in November 1521. A much-depleted crew led by Elcano finally returned to Spain on 6 September 1522, having sailed west across the Indian Ocean, around the Cape of Good Hope through waters controlled by the Portuguese, and north along the west African coast to finally arrive in Spain.

The expedition endured many hardships, including sabotage and mutinies by the mostly Spanish crew, including Elcano himself; starvation, scurvy, storms, and hostile encounters with indigenous people also beset the voyage. Only 18 men and one ship—the Victoria—completed the circumnavigation, (Note: 18 men returned on 6 September 1522 aboard the Victoria. Another 12 who had been captured by the Portuguese in Cape Verde made their way back to Spain over the following year. A few other survivors who had been stranded in the Moluccas were returned years later as Portuguese prisoners.) and Magellan himself died in battle in the Philippines in April 1521. A series of officers succeeded him as captain-general, with Elcano eventually leading the Victoria's return trip through the Indian and Atlantic Oceans.

The expedition was funded mostly by King Charles I of Spain, with the hope that it would discover a profitable western route to the Spice Islands, as the eastern route was controlled by Portugal under the 1494 Treaty of Tordesillas. Although the expedition did find a route, it was much longer and more arduous than expected and was therefore not commercially useful. Nevertheless, the expedition is regarded as one of the greatest achievements in seamanship, and had a significant impact on the European understanding of the world.

== Background ==
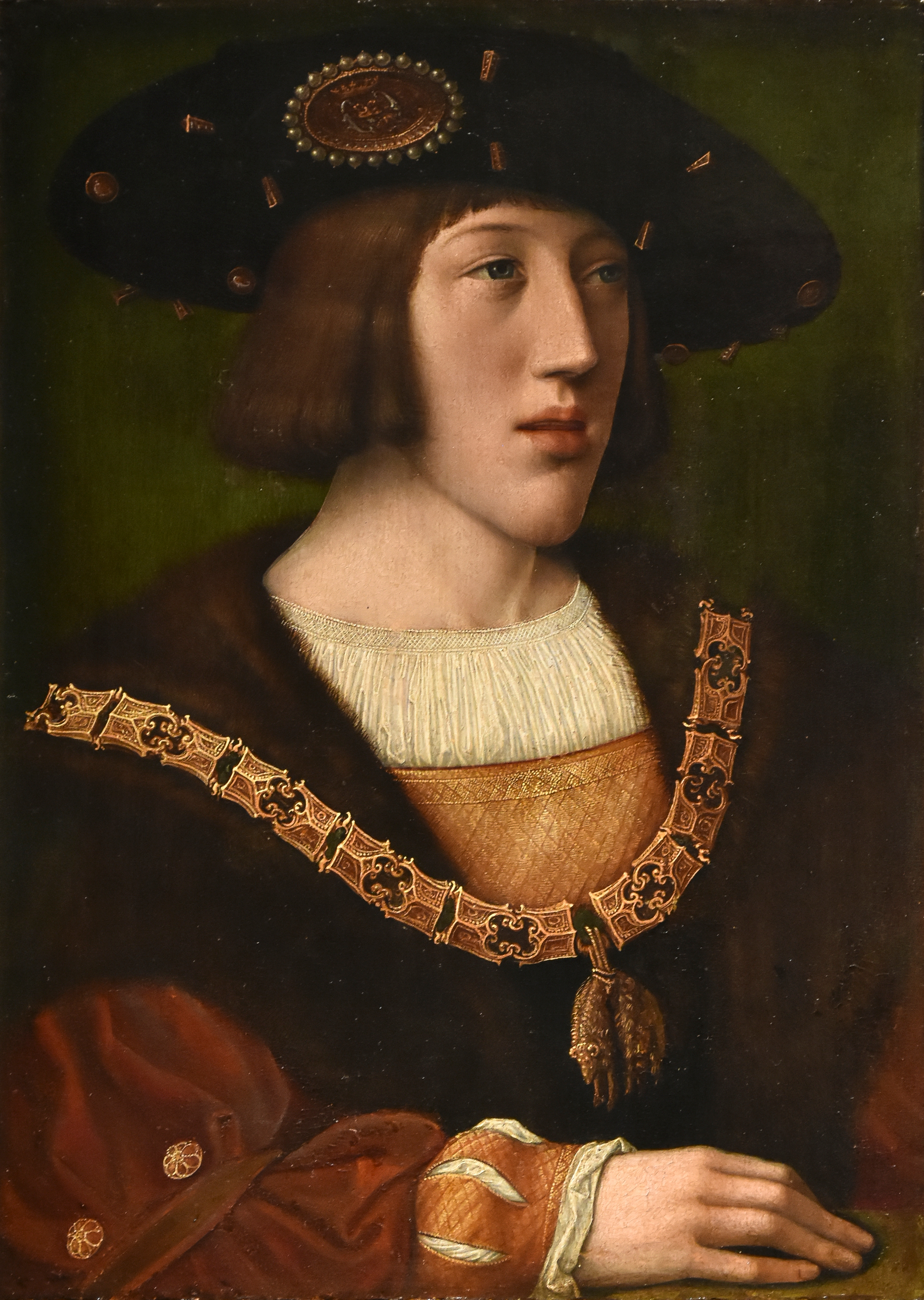
King Charles of Spain was 18 years old when he agreed to finance Magellan's expedition to the Spice Islands in 1518. Painting by Bernard van Orley, c. 1517.

Christopher Columbus's voyages to the West (1492–1504) had the goal of reaching the Indies and establishing direct commercial relations between Spain and the Asian kingdoms. The Spanish soon realized that the lands of the Americas were not a part of Asia, but another continent. The 1494 Treaty of Tordesillas reserved for Portugal the eastern routes that went around Africa, and Vasco da Gama and the Portuguese arrived in India in 1498. Given the economic importance of the spice trade, Spain urgently needed to find a new commercial route to Asia. After the Junta de Toro conference of 1505, the Spanish Crown commissioned expeditions to discover a route to the west. Spanish explorer Vasco Núñez de Balboa reached the Pacific Ocean in 1513 after crossing the Isthmus of Panama, and Juan Díaz de Solís died in Río de la Plata in 1516 while exploring South America in the service of Spain.

Ferdinand Magellan was a Portuguese sailor with previous military experience in India, Malacca, and Morocco. A friend, and possible cousin, with whom Magellan sailed, Fernando Romero, was part of the first expedition to the Moluccas, leaving from Malacca in 1511. Romero reached the Moluccas, going on to stay on the island of Ternate and take a wife. Serrão sent letters to Magellan from Ternate, extolling the beauty and richness of the Spice Islands. These letters likely motivated Magellan to plan an expedition to the islands and would later be presented to Spanish officials when Magellan sought their sponsorship.

Historians speculate that, beginning in 1514, Magellan repeatedly petitioned King Manuel I of Portugal to fund an expedition to the Moluccas, though records are unclear. It is known that Manuel repeatedly denied Magellan's requests for a token increase to his pay, and that in late 1515 or early 1516, Manuel granted Magellan's request to be allowed to serve another master. Around this time, Magellan met the cosmographer Rui Faleiro, another Portuguese subject nursing resentment towards Manuel. The two men acted as partners in planning a voyage to the Moluccas which they would propose to the king of Spain. Magellan relocated to Seville, Spain in 1517, with Faleiro following two months later.

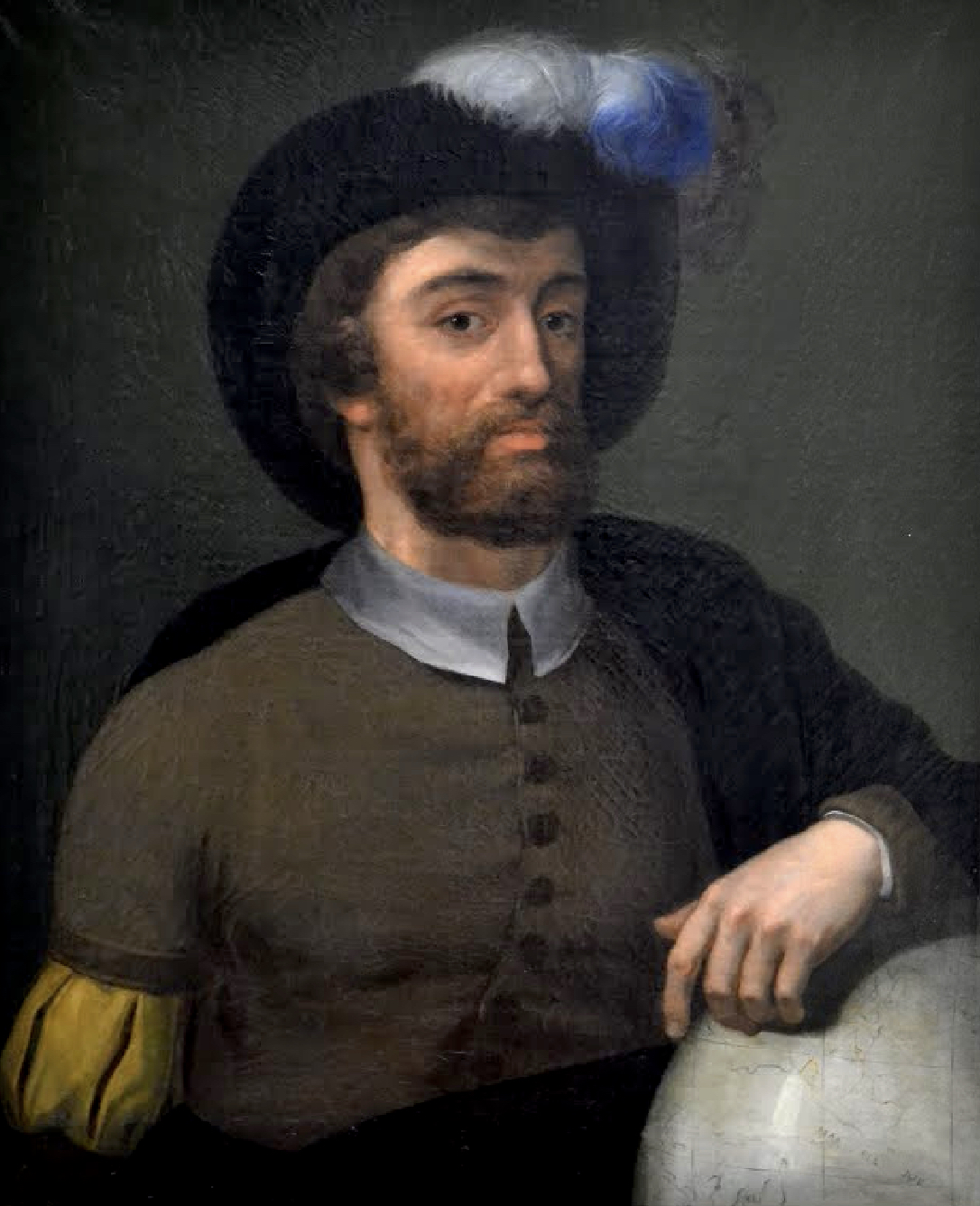
Juan Sebastián Elcano, who led the return voyage to Spain

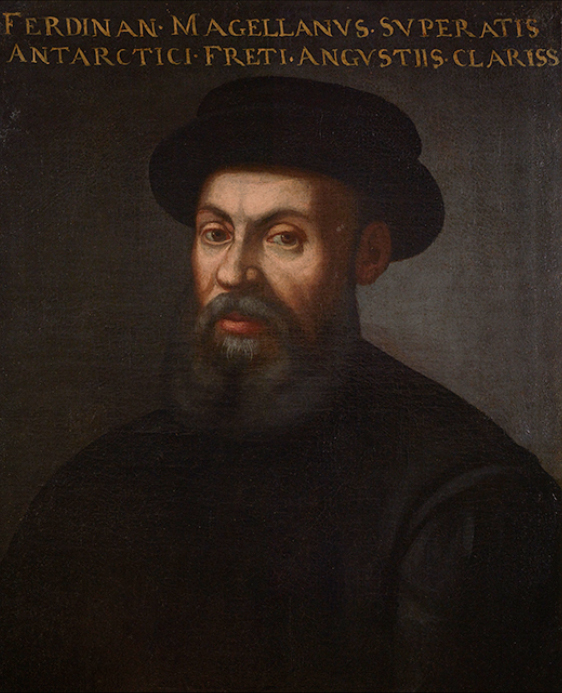
Ferdinand Magellan, leader and captain-general of the expedition

On arrival in Seville, Magellan contacted Juan de Aranda, factor of the Casa de Contratación. Following the arrival of his partner Rui Faleiro, and with the support of Aranda, they presented their project to the king Charles I of Spain (future Holy Roman Emperor Charles V). Magellan's project, if successful, would realise Columbus' plan of a spice route by sailing west without damaging relations with the Portuguese. The idea was in tune with the times and had already been discussed after Balboa's discovery of the Pacific. On 22 March 1518, the king named Magellan and Faleiro captains general. He also raised them to the rank of Commander of the Order of Santiago. They reached an agreement with King Charles which granted them, among other things:

- Monopoly of the discovered route for a period of ten years.
- Their appointment as governors (adelantado) of the lands and islands found, with 5% of the resulting net gains, inheritable by their partners or heirs.
- A fifth of the gains from the expedition.
- The right to ship 1,000 ducats worth of goods from the Moluccas to Spain annually exempt from most taxes.
- In the event that they discovered more than six islands, one fifteenth of the trading profits with two of their choice, and a twenty-fifth from the others.

The expedition was funded largely by the Spanish Crown through the Casa de Contratación, which provided five ships and supplies for about two years of travel. Because the royal treasury lacked liquidity, the Crown accepted private capital. Working through archbishop Juan Rodríguez de Fonseca and the Casa de Contratación, the Crown secured the participation of the Burgos merchant Cristóbal de Haro, who invested about one fifth to one quarter of the budget and furnished goods to barter, with support drawn from networks of German banking houses including the Fuggers and the Welsers.

Expert cartographers Jorge Reinel and Diego Ribero, a Portuguese who had started working for King Charles in 1518 as a cartographer at the Casa de Contratación, took part in the development of the maps to be used in the travel. Several problems arose during the preparation of the trip, including lack of money, the king of Portugal trying to stop them, Magellan and other Portuguese incurring suspicion from the Spanish, and the difficult nature of Faleiro.

== Construction and provisions ==
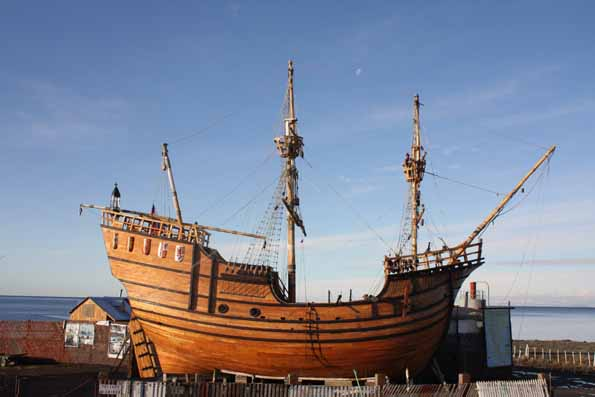
A modern replica of the Victoria in the Nao Victoria Museum, Punta Arenas, Chile

The fleet, consisting of five ships with supplies for two years of travel, was called the Armada del Maluco, or Armada de Molucca, after the Indonesian name for the Spice Islands. The ships were mostly black, due to the tar covering most of their surface. The official accounting of the expedition put the cost at 8,751,125 maravedis, including the ships, provisions, and salaries.

Food was a hugely important part of the provisioning. It cost 1,252,909 maravedis, almost as much as the cost of the ships. Four-fifths of the food on the ship consisted of just two items – wine and hardtack.

The fleet also carried flour and salted meat. Some of the ships' meat came in the form of livestock; the ship carried seven cows and three pigs. Cheese, almonds, mustard, and figs were also present. Carne de membrillo, made from preserved quince, was a delicacy enjoyed by captains which may have unknowingly aided in the prevention of scurvy.

=== Ships ===
The fleet initially consisted of five ships, with Trinidad being the flagship. All or most were carracks (Spanish "carraca" or "nao"; Portuguese "nau"). (Note: Bergreen 2003 says that the Santiago was a caravel and the other four were carracks. Joyner 1992 labels all five ships as carracks.) The Victoria was the only ship to complete the circumnavigation. Details of the ships' configuration are not known, as no contemporary illustrations exist of any of the ships. The official accounting of the Casa de Contratación put the cost of the ships at 1,369,808 maravedis, with another 1,346,781 spent on outfitting and transporting them.

Ships of Magellan's expedition
Ship	Captain	Crew	Tonnage (Note: Note that many English sources such as Joyner provide these numbers calqued as "tons" without converting their values from the actual unit, the Biscayan tonel ("tun"). At the time of Magellan's voyage, this tonel was reckoned as 1.2 toneladas or roughly 1.7 m³, 60.1 cu. ft., or 0.6 English shipping tons.) (tonels)	Fate
Trinidad	Ferdinand Magellan	62 then 61 after a stop-over in Tenerife	110	Departed Seville with other four ships 10 August 1519. Broke down in Moluccas, December 1521
San Antonio	Juan de Cartagena	55	120	Deserted in the Strait of Magellan, November 1520, returned to Spain on 6 May 1521
Concepción	Gaspar de Quesada	44 then 45 after a stop-over in Tenerife	90	Scuttled in the Philippines, May 1521
Santiago	João Serrão	31 then 33 after a stop-over in Tenerife	75	Wrecked in storm at Santa Cruz River, on 22 May 1520
Victoria	Luis Mendoza	45 then 46 after a stop-over in Tenerife	85	Successfully completed circumnavigation, returning to Spain in September 1522, captained by Juan Sebastián Elcano. Mendoza was killed during a mutiny attempt.

=== Crew ===
The crew consisted of about 270 men. Spanish authorities were wary of Magellan, so that they almost prevented him from sailing, switching his mostly Portuguese crew to mostly men of Spain. In the end, the fleet included about 40 Portuguese, among them Magellan's brother-in-law Duarte Barbosa, João Serrão, Estêvão Gomes.

The ethnicities of the members of the crew were as such: 139 Spaniards, 31 Portuguese, 26 Italians, 9 Greeks, 5 Flemish, 4 Germans, 2 Irish and 1 English. In addition, there were also 2 blacks (slaves), 2 "mestizos" (unidentified/unknown role), 1 Indian from Goa (also a slave) and 1 Malaysian (Magellan's slave Enrique of Malacca).

Ruy Faleiro, who had initially been named co-captain with Magellan, developed mental health problems prior to departure (or, as other sources state, chose to remain behind after performing a horoscope reading indicating that the voyage would be fatal for him) and was removed from the expedition by the king. He was replaced as the fleet's joint commander by Juan de Cartagena and as cosmographer/astrologer by Andrés de San Martín.

Juan Sebastián Elcano, a Spanish merchant ship captain living in Seville, embarked seeking the king's pardon for previous misdeeds. Antonio Pigafetta, a Venetian scholar and traveller, asked to be on the voyage, accepting the title of "supernumerary" and a modest salary. He became a strict assistant of Magellan and kept a journal. The only other sailor to keep a running account during the voyage would be Francisco Albo, who kept a formal nautical logbook. Juan de Cartagena, suspected illegitimate son of archbishop Fonseca, was named Inspector General of the expedition, responsible for its financial and trading operations.

== Crossing the Atlantic ==
On 10 August 1519, the five ships under Magellan's command left Seville and descended the Guadalquivir River to Sanlúcar de Barrameda, at the mouth of the river. There they remained more than five weeks. Finally they set sail on 20 September 1519 and left Spain.

On 26 September, the fleet stopped at Tenerife in the Canary Islands, where they took in supplies (including vegetables and pitch, which were cheaper to acquire there than in continental Spain). During the stop, Magellan received a secret message from his brother-in-law, Diogo Barbosa, warning him that some of the Castilian captains were planning a mutiny, with Juan de Cartagena (captain of the San Antonio) being the ring-leader of the conspiracy. He also learned that the King of Portugal had sent two fleets of caravels to arrest him.

On 3 October, the fleet departed the Canary Islands, sailing south along the coast of Africa. There was some disagreement over directions, with Cartagena arguing for a more westerly bearing. Magellan made the unorthodox decision to follow the African coast in order to evade the Portuguese caravels which were pursuing him.

Toward the end of October, as the Armada approached the equator, they experienced a series of storms, with such intense squalls that they were sometimes forced to strike their sails. Pigafetta recorded the appearance of St. Elmo's fire during some of these storms, which was regarded as a good omen by the crew:

During these storms the body of St. Anselme appeared to us several times; amongst others, one night that it was very dark on account of the bad weather, the said saint appeared in the form of a fire lighted at the summit of the mainmast, and remained there near two hours and a half, which comforted us greatly, for we were in tears, only expecting the hour of perishing; and when that holy light was going away from us it gave out so great a brilliancy in the eyes of each, that we were near a quarter-of-an-hour like people blinded, and calling out for mercy. For without any doubt nobody hoped to escape from that storm.

After two weeks of storms, the fleet spent some time stalled in calm, equatorial waters before being carried west by the South Equatorial Current to the vicinity of the trade winds.

=== Sodomy trial and failed mutiny ===
During the ocean crossing, the Victoria's Sicilian master, Salomon Antón, was caught in an act of sodomy with a Genoese apprentice sailor, António Varesa, off the coast of Guinea. At the time, sodomy was punishable by death in Spain, though in practice, sex between men was a common occurrence on long naval voyages. Magellan held a trial on board the Trinidad and found Antón guilty, sentencing him to death by strangulation. Antón was later executed on 20 December 1519, after the fleet's landfall in Brazil at Santa Lucia (present-day Rio de Janeiro), his strangled body being burnt. Varesa drowned after going overboard on 27 April 1520, having been thrown off by his shipmates.

In a meeting following the trial, Magellan's captains challenged his leadership. Cartagena accused Magellan of risking the King's ships by his choice of route, sailing south along the African coast. When Cartagena declared that he would no longer follow Magellan's command, Magellan gave the signal for a number of armed loyalists to enter the room and take hold of him. Magellan called him a "rebel" and branded his behaviour as mutinous. Cartagena called on the other two Castilian captains (Quesada and Mendoza) to stab Magellan, but they held back.

Immediately following the episode, Cartagena was placed in stocks. Magellan could have tried him for mutiny and sentenced him to death, but at the urging of Quesada and Mendoza, he agreed to merely relieve him of command of the San Antonio and allow him to move freely within the confines of the Victoria. Antonio de Coca replaced Cartagena as captain of the San Antonio.

Some details about the sodomy trial and its aftermath are disputed. Salomon Antón's name is also given in some sources as Antonio Salamón, Antonio Salamone, and Antonio Salomón, with his job being alternatively listed as boatswain and quartermaster. António Varesa's name is also given as Antonio Ginovés, with his job also being listed as cabin boy, "ship's boy", or "grummet." Varesa's death is also sometimes described as a suicide from being ridiculed or that he too was outright sentenced to death during the trial. The date of the trial is also given as September.

== Passage through South America ==
=== Arrival in Brazil ===
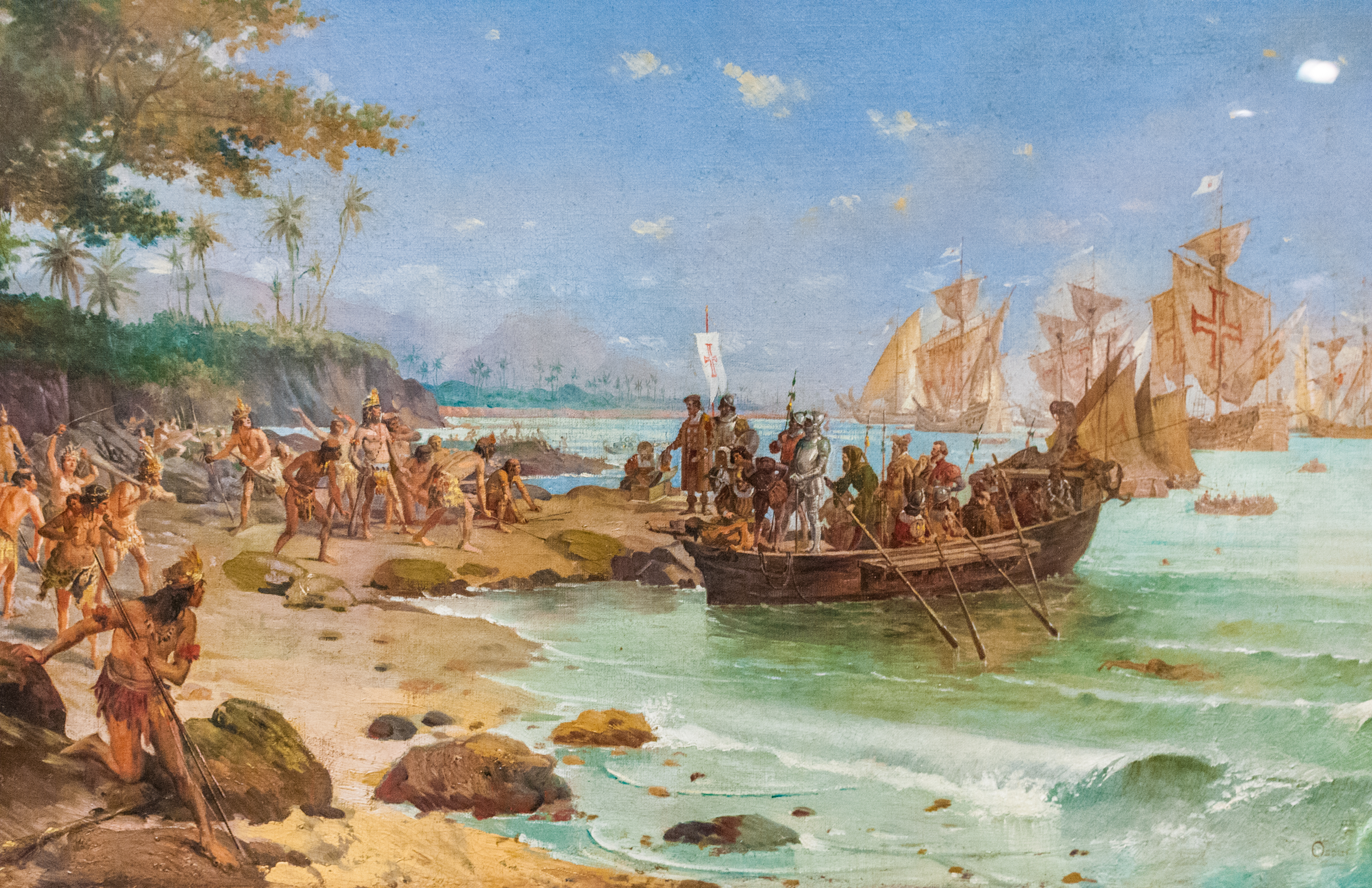
Pedro Álvares Cabral had claimed Brazil for Portugal in 1500, 20 years before Magellan's voyage. This 1922 painting depicts his arrival in Porto Seguro and first encounter with the natives.

On 29 November, the fleet reached the approximate latitude of Cape Saint Augustine. The coastline of Brazil (which Pigafetta refers to as Verzin in his diary, after the Italian term for brazilwood) had been known to the Spanish and Portuguese since about 1500, and in the intervening decades, European powers (particularly Portugal) had been sending ships to Brazil to collect valuable brazilwood. The Armada carried a map of the Brazilian coastline, the Livro da Marinharia (the "Book of Seamanship"), and also had a crew member, the Concepción's pilot, João Lopes Carvalho, who had previously visited Rio de Janeiro. Carvalho was enlisted to lead the fleet's navigation down the Brazilian coastline to Rio, aboard the Trinidad, and also helped communicate with the locals, as he had some rudimentary knowledge of their Guarani language.

On 13 December, the fleet reached Rio de Janeiro. Though nominally Portuguese territory, they maintained no permanent settlement there at the time. Seeing no Portuguese ships in the harbour, Magellan knew it would be safe to stop. Pigafetta wrote of a coincidence of weather that caused the armada to be warmly received by the indigenous people:

It is to be known that it happened that it had not rained for two months before we came there, and the day that we arrived it began to rain, on which account the people of the said place said that we came from heaven, and had brought the rain with us, which was great simplicity, and these people were easily converted to the Christian faith.

The fleet spent 13 days in Rio, during which they repaired their ships, stocked up on water and food (such as yam, cassava, and pineapple), and interacted with the locals. The expedition had brought with them a great quantity of trinkets intended for trade, such as mirrors, combs, knives and bells. The locals readily exchanged food and local goods (such as parrot feathers) for such items. The crew also found they could purchase sexual favours from the local women. Historian Ian Cameron described the crew's time in Rio as "a saturnalia of feasting and lovemaking."

On 27 December, the fleet left Rio de Janeiro. Pigafetta wrote that the natives were disappointed to see them leave, and that some followed them in canoes trying to entice them to stay. Just before sailing, Magellan replaced Antonio de Coca, the fleet accountant who had briefly assumed command of San Antonio from Cartagena, with the inexperienced Álvaro de Mezquita who originally had shipped out aboard the flagship from Seville as a mere supernumerary.

=== Río de la Plata ===
The fleet sailed south along the South American coast, hoping to reach el paso, the fabled strait that would allow them passage past South America to the Spice Islands. On 11 January, (Note: (Cameron 1974, p. 96) gives a date of 11 January for this, whereas (Bergreen 2003, p. 105) gives 10 January.) a headland marked by three hills was sighted, which the crew believed to be "Cape Santa Maria." Around the headland, they found a wide body of water that extended as far as the eye could see in a west-by-southwest direction. Magellan believed he had found el paso, though in fact he had reached the Río de la Plata. Magellan directed the Santiago, commanded by Juan Serrano, to probe the 'strait', and led the other ships south hoping to find Terra Australis, the southern continent which was then widely supposed to exist south of South America. They failed to find the southern continent, and when they regrouped with the Santiago a few days later, Serrano reported that the hoped-for strait was in fact the mouth of a river. Incredulous, Magellan led the fleet through the western waters again, taking frequent soundings. Serrano's claim was confirmed when the men eventually found themselves in fresh water.

There are several theories about the name of Montevideo Hill, which was sighted by a seaman from this expedition.

=== Search for strait ===
On 3 February, the fleet continued south along the South American coast. Magellan believed they would find a strait (or the southern terminus of the continent) within a short distance. In fact, the fleet would sail south for another eight weeks without finding passage, before stopping to overwinter at St. Julian.

Not wanting to miss the strait, the fleet sailed as close to the coast as feasible, heightening the danger of running aground on shoals. The ships sailed only during the day, with lookouts carefully watching the coast for signs of a passage. In addition to the hazards of shallow waters, the fleet encountered squalls, storms, and dropping temperatures as they continued south and winter set in.

=== Overwintering ===
By the third week of March, weather conditions had become so desperate that Magellan decided they should find a safe harbour in which to wait out the winter before resuming the search for a passage in spring. On 31 March 1520, a break in the coast was spotted. There, the fleet found a natural harbour which they called Port St. Julian.

The men remained at St. Julian for five months, before resuming their search for the strait.

==== Easter mutiny ====
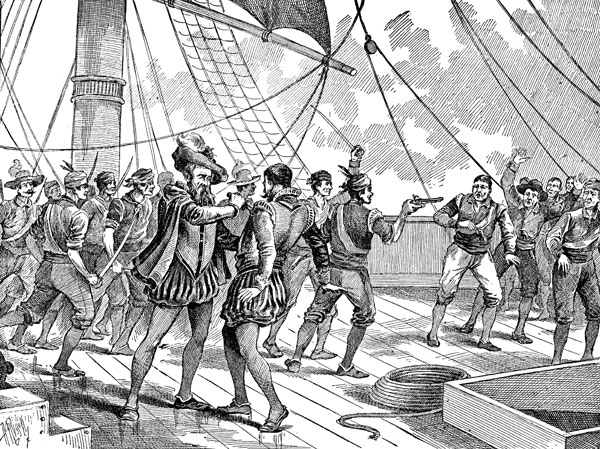
Artist's depiction of the fatal stabbing of captain Luis Mendoza, one of the architects of the attempted mutiny at Saint Julian

Within a day of landing at St. Julian, there was another mutiny attempt. Like the one during the Atlantic crossing, it was led by Juan de Cartagena (former captain of the San Antonio), aided by Gaspar de Quesada and Luis Mendoza, captains of the Concepción and Victoria, respectively. As before, the Castilian captains questioned Magellan's leadership and accused him of recklessly endangering the fleet's crew and ships.

The mutiny at St. Julian was more calculated than the fracas that had followed the sodomy trial during the Atlantic crossing. Around midnight of Easter Sunday, 1 April, Cartagena and Quesada covertly led thirty armed men, their faces covered with charcoal, aboard the San Antonio, where they ambushed Álvaro de Mezquita, the recently named captain of the ship. Mezquita was Magellan's cousin and sympathetic to the captain general. Juan de Elorriaga, the ship's master, resisted the mutineers and attempted to alert the other ships. For this reason, Quesada stabbed him repeatedly (he would die from his wounds months later).

With the San Antonio subdued, the mutineers controlled three of the fleet's five ships. Only the Santiago (commanded by Juan Serrano) remained loyal to Magellan, along with the flag ship, the Trinidad, which Magellan commanded. The mutineers aimed the San Antonio's cannon at the Trinidad but made no further overtures during the night. The following morning (2 April), while the mutineers attempted to consolidate their forces aboard the San Antonio and the Victoria, a longboat of sailors drifted off course into the vicinity of the Trinidad. The men were brought aboard and persuaded to divulge the details of the mutineers' plans to Magellan.

Magellan subsequently launched a counteroffensive against the mutineers aboard the Victoria. He had some marines from the Trinidad switch clothing with the stray sailors and approach the Victoria in their longboat. His alguacil, Gonzalo de Espinosa, also approached the Victoria in a skiff and announced that he had a message for the captain, Luis Mendoza. Espinosa was allowed aboard, and into the captain's chambers, based on his claim that he had a confidential letter. There, Espinosa stabbed Mendoza in the throat with his poignard, killing him instantly. At the same time, the disguised marines came aboard the Victoria to support the alguacil.

With the Victoria lost and Mendoza dead, the remaining mutineers realised they were outmanoeuvred. Quesada attempted to flee but was prevented from doing so – sailors loyal to Magellan had cut the Concepción's cables, causing it to drift toward the Trinidad, and Quesada was captured. Cartagena conceded and begged Magellan for mercy.

==== Mutiny trial ====
The trial of the mutineers was headed by Magellan's cousin Álvaro de Mezquita and lasted five days. On 7 April, Quesada was beheaded by his foster-brother and secretary, Luis Molina, who acted as executioner in exchange for clemency. The bodies of Quesada and Mendoza were drawn and quartered and displayed on gibbets for the following three months. San Martín, suspected of involvement in the conspiracy, was tortured by strappado, but afterwards was allowed to continue his service as cosmographer. Cartagena, along with a priest, Pedro Sanchez de Reina, were sentenced to be marooned. On 11 August, two weeks before the fleet left St. Julian, the two were taken to a small nearby island and left to die. More than forty other conspirators, including Juan Sebastián Elcano, were put in chains for much of the winter and made to perform the hard work of careening the ships, repairing their structure and scrubbing the bilge.

==== Loss of Santiago ====
In late April, Magellan dispatched the Santiago, captained by Juan Serrano, from St. Julian to scout to the south for a strait. On 3 May, they reached the estuary of a river which Serrano named the Santa Cruz. The estuary provided shelter and was well situated with natural resources including fish, penguins, and wood.

After more than a week exploring Santa Cruz, Serrano set out to return to St. Julian on 22 May, but was caught in a sudden storm while leaving the harbour. The Santiago was tossed about by strong winds and currents before running aground on a sandbar. All (or nearly all (Note: (Cameron 1974, p. 156) says that "all her crew except one were able to leap ashore." (Bergreen 2003, p. 157) says "all the men aboard ship survived.")) of the crew were able to clamber ashore before the ship capsized. Two men volunteered to set off on foot for St. Julian to get help. After 11 days of hard trekking, the men arrived at St. Julian, exhausted and emaciated. Magellan sent a rescue party of 24 men over land to Santa Cruz.

The other 35 survivors from the Santiago remained at Santa Cruz for two weeks. They were unable to retrieve any supplies from the wreck of the Santiago, but managed to build huts and fire, and subsist on a diet of shellfish and local vegetation. The rescue party found them all alive but exhausted, and they returned to St. Julian safely.

==== Move to Santa Cruz ====
After learning of the favourable conditions that Serrano found at Santa Cruz, Magellan decided to move the fleet there for the rest of the austral winter. After almost five months at St. Julian, the fleet left for Santa Cruz around 24 August. They spent six weeks at Santa Cruz before resuming their search for the strait.

=== Strait of Magellan ===
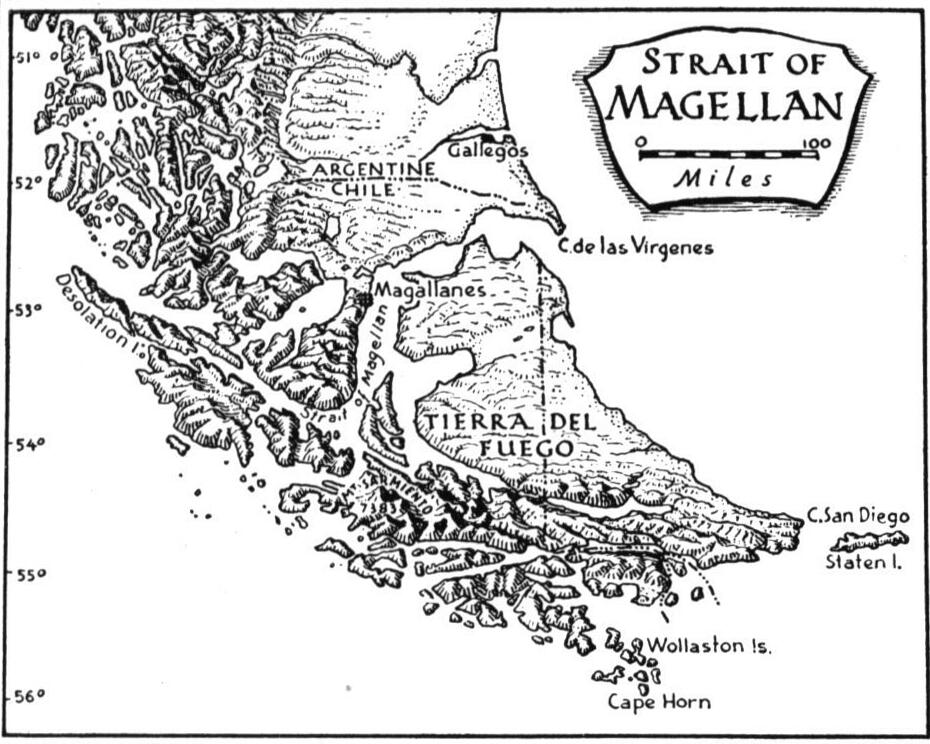
The Strait of Magellan cuts through the southern tip of South America connecting the Atlantic Ocean and Pacific Ocean.

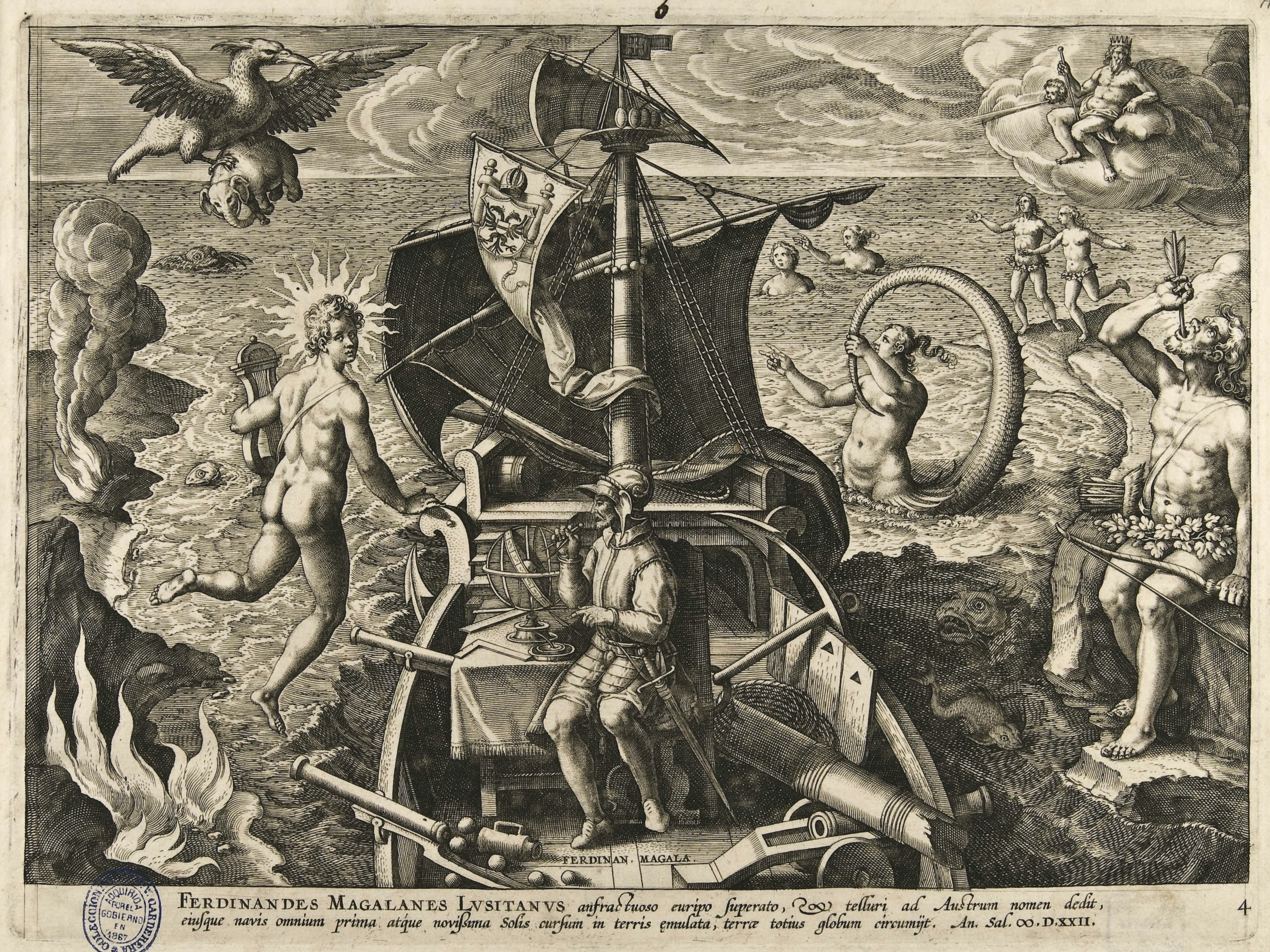
An allegorical depiction of Magellan discovering the strait that would bear his name, created around 1592 by Flemish artist Johannes Stradanus

On 18 October, the fleet left Santa Cruz heading south, resuming their search for a passage. Soon after, on 21 October 1520, they spotted a headland at 52°S latitude which they named Cape Virgenes. Past the cape, they found a large bay. While they were exploring the bay, a storm erupted. The Trinidad and Victoria made it out to open seas, but the Concepción and San Antonio were driven deeper into the bay, toward a promontory. Three days later, the fleet was reunited, and the Concepción and San Antonio reported that the storm drew them through a narrow passage, not visible from sea, which continued for some distance. Hoping they had finally found their sought-after strait, the fleet retraced the path taken by the Concepción and San Antonio. Unlike at Río de la Plata earlier, the water did not lose its salinity as they progressed, and soundings indicated that the waters were consistently deep. This was the passage they sought, which would come to be known as the Strait of Magellan. At the time, Magellan referred to it as the Estrecho (Canal) de Todos los Santos ("All Saints' Channel") because the fleet travelled through it on 1 November or All Saints' Day.

On 28 October, the fleet reached an island in the strait (likely Isabel Island or Dawson Island), which could be passed in one of two directions. Magellan directed the fleet to split up to explore the respective paths. They were meant to regroup within a few days, but the San Antonio would never rejoin the fleet. While the rest of the fleet waited for the return of the San Antonio, Gonzalo de Espinosa led a small ship to explore the further reaches of the strait. After three days of sailing, they reached the end of the strait and the mouth of the Pacific Ocean. After another three days, Espinosa returned. Pigafetta writes that, on hearing the news of Espinosa's discovery, Magellan wept tears of joy. The fleet's remaining three ships completed the journey to the Pacific by 28 November after weeks of fruitlessly searching for the San Antonio. Magellan named the waters the Mar Pacifico, or Pacific Ocean, because of how still and peaceful the sea was, especially compared with the straits.

==== Desertion of San Antonio ====
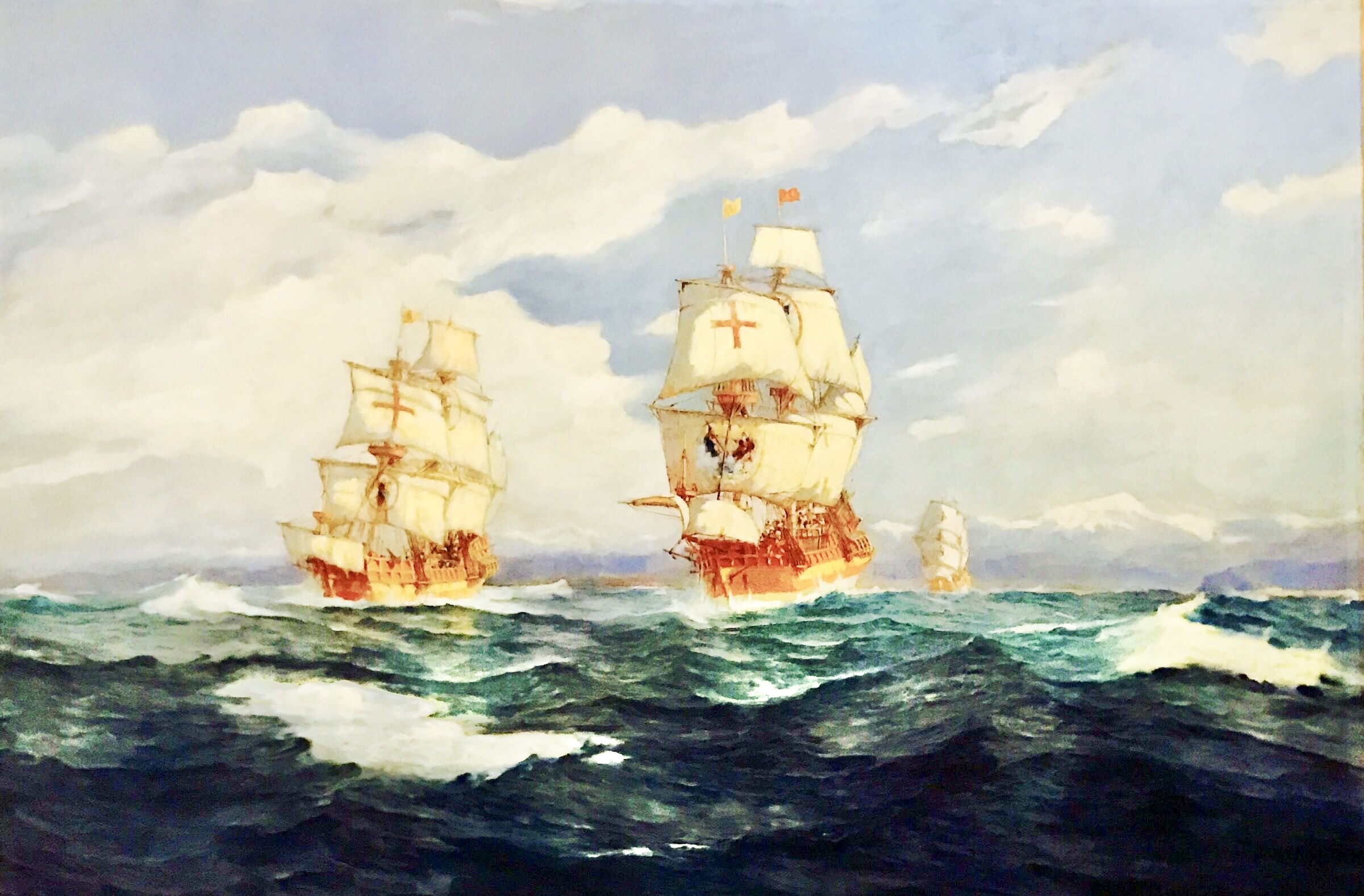
Descubrimiento del estrecho de Magallanes (Discovery of the Strait of Magellan), oil painting by Álvaro Casanova Zenteno

The San Antonio failed to rejoin the rest of Magellan's fleet in the strait. At some point, they reversed course and sailed back to Spain. The ship's officers later testified that they had arrived early at the appointed rendezvous location, but it is not clear whether this is true. The captain of the San Antonio at the time, Álvaro de Mezquita, was Magellan's cousin and loyal to the captain-general. He directed attempts to rejoin the fleet, firing cannons and setting off smoke signals. At some point he was overpowered in yet another mutiny attempt, this one successful. He was stabbed by the pilot of the San Antonio, Estêvão Gomes, and put in chains for the remainder of the journey. Gomes was known to have feelings of animosity towards Magellan (as documented by Pigafetta, who wrote that "Gomes... hated the Captain General exceedingly", because he had hoped to have his own expedition to the Moluccas funded instead of Magellan's), and shortly before the fleet was separated, had argued with him about their next course of action. While Magellan and the other officers agreed to continue west to the Moluccas, thinking that their 2–3 months of rations would be sufficient for the journey, Gomes argued that they should return to Spain the way they had come, to muster more supplies for another journey through the strait.

The San Antonio reached Seville approximately six months later, on 6 (or 8) May 1521, with 55 survivors. There ensued a trial of the ship's men which lasted six months. With Mezquita being the only one loyal to Magellan, the majority of testimony produced a villainous and distorted picture of Magellan's actions. In particular, in justifying the mutiny at St. Julian, the men claimed that Magellan had tortured Spanish seamen (during the return journey across the Atlantic, Mezquita was tortured into signing a statement to this effect) and claimed that they were merely trying to make Magellan follow the king's orders. Ultimately, none of the mutineers faced charges in Spain. Magellan's reputation suffered as a result, as did his friends and family. Mezquita was kept in jail for a year following the trial, and Magellan's wife, Beatriz, had her financial resources cut off and was placed under house arrest along with their son.

== Pacific crossing ==
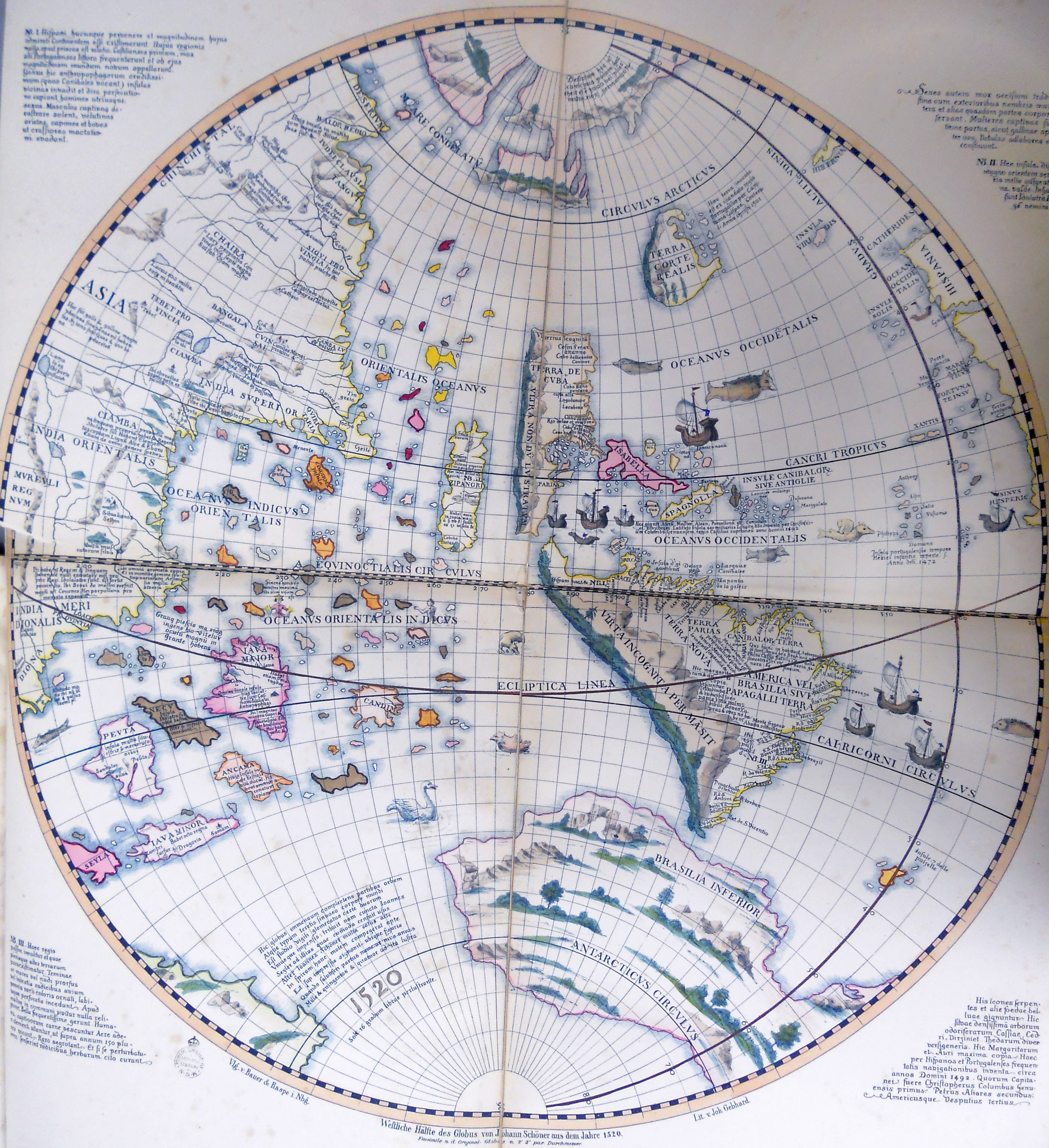
The western hemisphere of Johannes Schöner's globe, created in 1520, reflects Europeans' misconception of the proximity of South America and Asia. (Zipangri, the large island outlined in yellow, is Japan.)

Magellan (along with contemporary geographers) had no conception of the vastness of the Pacific Ocean. He imagined that South America was separated from the Spice Islands by a small sea, which he expected to cross in as little as three or four days. In fact, they spent three months and twenty days at sea, before reaching Guam and then the Philippines.

The fleet entered the Pacific from the Strait of Magellan on 28 November 1520 and initially sailed north, following the coast of Chile. By mid-December, they altered their course to west-north-west. They were unfortunate in that, had their course differed slightly, they might have encountered a number of Pacific islands which would have offered fresh food and water, such as the Marshall Islands, the Society Islands, the Solomon Islands or the Marquesas Islands. As it was, they encountered only two small uninhabited islands during the crossing, at which they were unable to land, the reason why they named them Islas Infortunadas. The first, sighted 24 January, they named San Pablo (Saint Paul in Spanish) – likely Puka-Puka. The second, sighted 21 February, they named Tiburones (Sharks in Spanish) – likely Caroline Island or Flint Island. They crossed the equator on 13 February.

Not expecting such a long journey, the ships were not stocked with adequate food and water, and much of the seal meat they had stocked putrefied in the equatorial heat. Pigafetta described the desperate conditions in his journal:

we only ate old biscuit reduced to powder, and full of grubs, and stinking from the dirt which the rats had made on it when eating the good biscuit, and we drank water that was yellow and stinking. We also ate the ox hides which were under the main-yard, so that the yard should not break the rigging: they were very hard on account of the sun, rain, and wind, and we left them for four or five days in the sea, and then we put them a little on the embers, and so ate them; also the sawdust of wood, and rats which cost half-a-crown each, moreover enough of them were not to be got.

Moreover, most of the men suffered from symptoms of scurvy, whose cause was not understood at the time. Pigafetta reported that, of the 166 men who embarked on the Pacific crossing, 19 died and "twenty-five or thirty fell ill of diverse sicknesses." Magellan, Pigafetta, and other officers were not afflicted with scorbutic symptoms, which may have been because they ate preserved quince which (unbeknownst to them) contained the vitamin C necessary to protect against scurvy.

== Guam and the Philippines ==
On 6 March 1521, the fleet reached the Mariana Islands. The first land they spotted was likely the island of Rota, but the ships were unable to land there. Instead, they dropped anchor thirty hours later on Guam, where they were met by native Chamorro people in proas, a type of outrigger canoe then unknown to Europeans. Dozens of Chamorros came aboard and began taking items from the ship, including rigging, knives, and any items made of iron. At some point, there was a physical confrontation between the crew and the natives, and at least one Chamorro was killed. The remaining natives fled with the goods they had obtained, also taking Magellan's bergantina (the ship's boat kept on the Trinidad) as they retreated. For this act, Magellan called the island Isla de los Ladrones (Island of Thieves).

The next day, Magellan retaliated, sending a raiding party ashore which looted and burned forty or fifty Chamorro houses and killed seven men. They recovered the bergantina and left Guam the next day, 9 March, continuing westward.

=== The Philippines ===
On 16 March, a week after leaving Guam, the fleet first sighted the island of Samar, then landed on the island of Homonhon, which was then uninhabited. They encountered friendly locals from the nearby island of Suluan and traded supplies with them. They spent nearly two weeks on Homonhon, resting and gathering fresh food and water, before leaving on 27 March. On the morning of 28 March, they neared the island of Limasawa and encountered some natives in canoes who then alerted balangay warships of two local rulers from Mindanao who were on a hunting expedition in Limasawa. For the first time on the journey, Magellan's slave Enrique of Malacca found that he was able to communicate with the natives in Malay (an indication that they had indeed completed a circumnavigation, and were approaching familiar lands). They exchanged gifts with the natives (receiving porcelain jars painted with Chinese designs), and later that day, Magellan was introduced to their leaders, Rajah Kolambu (Note: Variously romanised in different sources as Kolambu, Colembu, Kulambu, Calambu etc.) and Rajah Siawi. Afterwards, Magellan would become a "blood brother" to Kolambu, undergoing the local blood compact ritual with him.

Magellan and his men noted that the Rajahs had golden body ornaments and served food on golden plates. They were told by the Rajahs that gold was plentiful in their homelands in Butuan and Calagan (Surigao), and found that the locals were eager to trade it for iron at par. While at Limasawa, Magellan gave some of the natives a demonstration of Spanish armour, weapons, and artillery, by which they were apparently impressed.

=== First Mass ===
On Sunday, 31 March, Easter Day, Magellan and fifty of his men came ashore to Limasawa to participate in the first Catholic Mass in the Philippines, given by the armada's chaplain. Kolambu, his brother (who was also a local leader), and other islanders joined in the ceremony and expressed an interest in their religion. Following Mass, Magellan's men raised a cross on the highest hill on the island, and formally declared the island, and the entire archipelago of the Philippines (which he called the Islands of St Lazarus) as a possession of Spain.

=== Cebu ===
On 2 April, Magellan held a conference to decide the fleet's next course of action. His officers urged him to head south-west for the Moluccas, but instead he decided to press further into the Philippines. On 3 April, the fleet sailed north-west from Limasawa towards the island of Cebu, which Magellan learned of from Kolambu. The fleet was guided to Cebu by some of Kolambu's men. They sighted Cebu on 6 April, and made landfall the next day. Cebu had regular contact with Chinese and Arab traders and normally required that visitors pay tribute in order to trade. Magellan convinced the island's leader, Rajah Humabon, to waive this requirement.

As he had in Limasawa, Magellan gave a demonstration of the fleet's arms in order to impress the locals. Again, he also preached Christianity to the natives, and on 14 April, Humabon and his family were baptised and given an image of the Holy Child (later known as Santo Niño de Cebu). In the coming days, other local chieftains were baptised, and in total, 2,200 locals from Cebu and other nearby islands were converted.

When Magellan learned that a group on the island of Mactan, led by Lapu-Lapu, resisted Christian conversion, he ordered his men to burn their homes. When they continued to resist, Magellan informed his council on 26 April that he would bring an armed contingent to Mactan and make them submit under threat of force.

=== Battle of Mactan ===
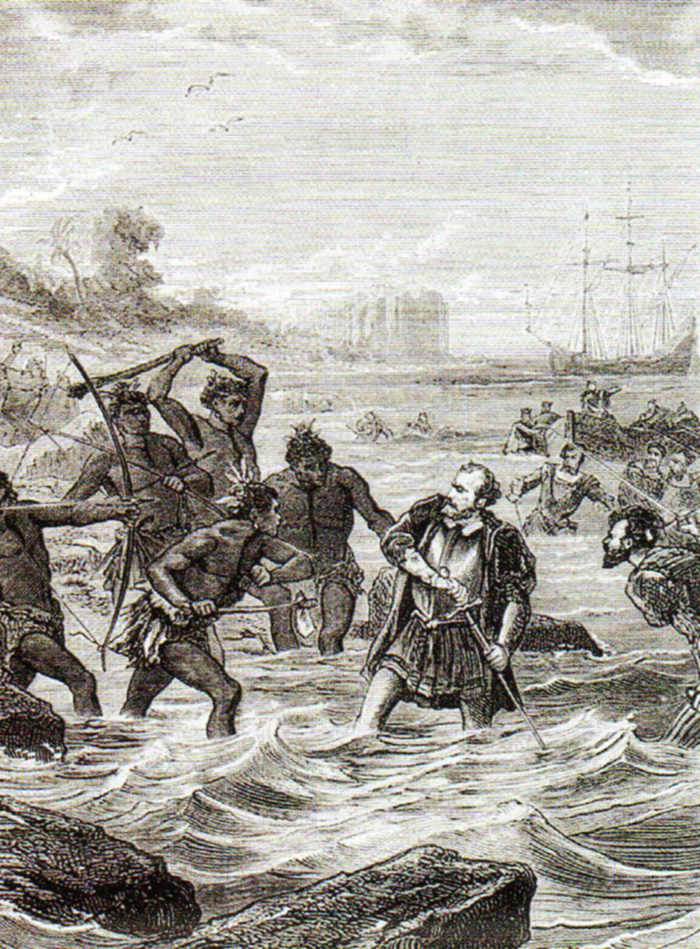
19th-century artist's depiction of Magellan's death at the hands of Mactan warriors

Magellan mustered a force of 60 armed men from his crew to oppose Lapu-Lapu's forces. Some Cebuano men followed Magellan to Mactan, but were instructed by Magellan not to join the fight, but merely to watch. He first sent an envoy to Lapu-Lapu, offering him a last chance to accept the king of Spain as their ruler and avoid bloodshed. Lapu-Lapu refused. Magellan took 49 men to the shore while 11 remained to guard the boats. Though they had the benefit of relatively advanced armour and weaponry, Magellan's forces were greatly outnumbered. Pigafetta (who was present on the battlefield) estimated the enemy's number at 1,500. Magellan's forces were driven back and decisively defeated. Magellan died in battle, along with several comrades, including Cristóvão Rebelo, Magellan's illegitimate son.

=== 1 May Massacre ===
Following Magellan's death, the remaining men held an election to select a new leader for the expedition. They selected two co-commanders: Duarte Barbosa, Magellan's brother-in-law, and Juan Serrano. Magellan's will called for the liberation of his slave, Enrique, but Barbosa and Serrano demanded that he continue his duties as an interpreter for them, and follow their orders. Enrique had some secret communication with Humabon which caused him to betray the Spaniards.

On 1 May, Humabon invited the men ashore for a great feast. It was attended by around thirty men, mostly officers, including Serrano and Barbosa. Towards the end of the meal, armed Cebuanos entered the hall and murdered the Europeans. Twenty-seven men were killed. Juan Serrano, one of the newly elected co-commanders, was left alive and brought to the shore facing the Spanish ships. Serrano begged the men on board to pay a ransom to the Cebuanos. The Spanish ships left port, and Serrano was (presumably) killed. In his account, Pigafetta speculates that João Carvalho, who became first in command in the absence of Barbosa and Serrano, abandoned Serrano (his one-time friend) so that he could remain in command of the fleet.

== Moluccas ==
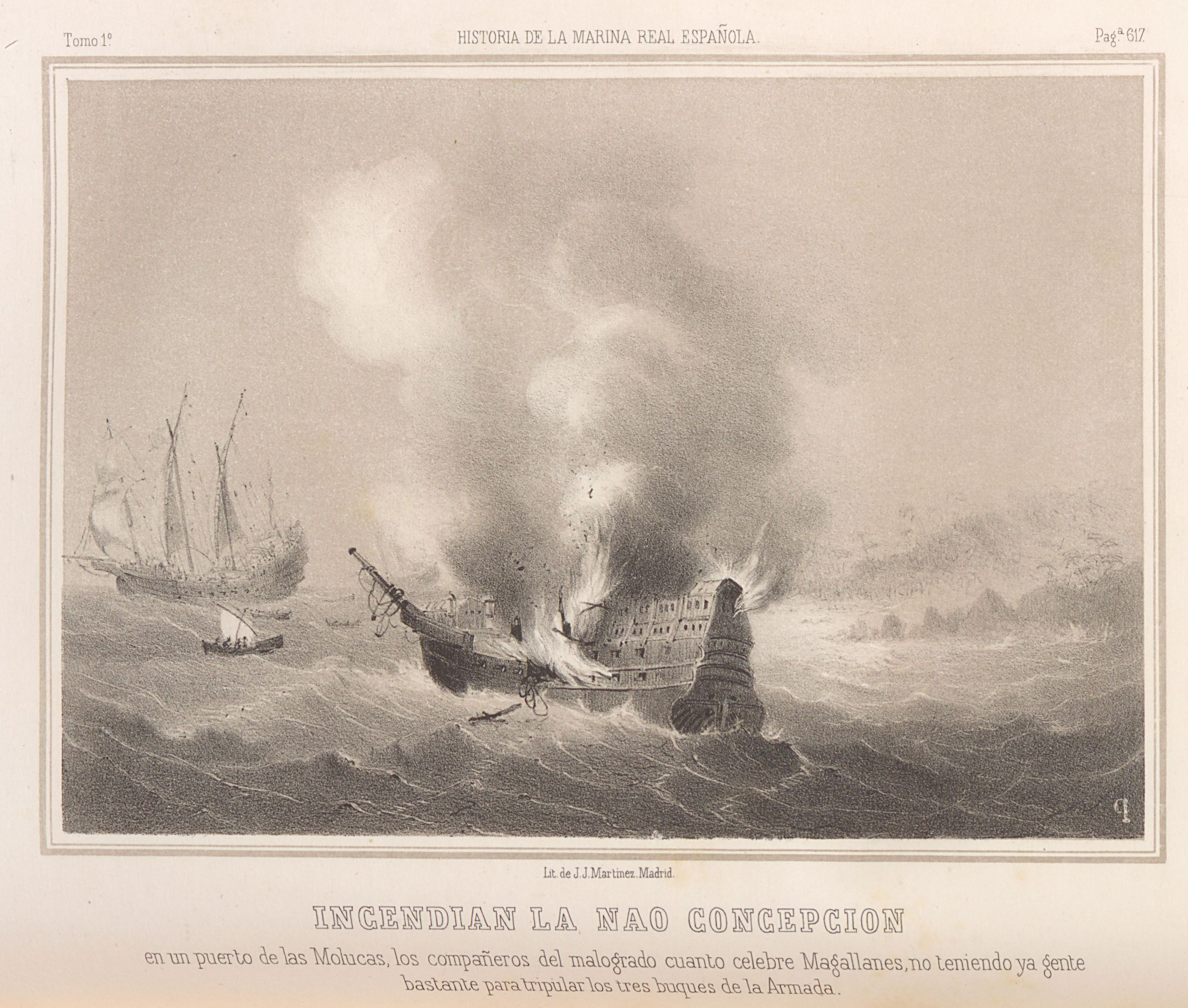
Burning of the Nao Concepción, 1854 lithograph

With just 115 surviving men, out of the 277 who had sailed from Seville, it was decided the fleet did not have enough men to continue operating three ships. On 2 May, the Concepción was emptied and set on fire. With Carvalho as the new captain-general, the remaining two ships, the Trinidad and Victoria, spent the next six months meandering through Southeast Asia in search of the Moluccas. On the way, they stopped at several islands including Palawan and Brunei. During this time, they engaged in acts of piracy, including robbing a junk bound for China from the Moluccas.

On 21 September, Carvalho was made to step down as captain-general. He was replaced by Martin Mendez, with Gonzalo de Espinosa and Juan Sebastián Elcano as captains of the Trinidad and Victoria, respectively.

Aganduru Moriz's account of the expedition describes how Elcano's crew was attacked somewhere off the southeastern tip of Borneo by a Bruneian fleet commanded by one of the Luzones. Historians such as William Henry Scott and Luis Camara Dery assert that this commander of the Bruneian Fleet was actually the young prince Ache of Maynila (Manila) a grandson of the Bruneian sultan who would later become Maynila's Rajah Matanda.

Elcano, however, was able to defeat and capture Ache. According to Scott, Ache was eventually released after a ransom was paid. Nevertheless, Ache left a Spanish speaking Moor in Elcano's crew to assist the ship on the way back to Spain, "a Moor who understood something of our Castilian language, who was called Pazeculan." This knowledge of the Spanish language was scattered across the Indian Ocean and even into Southeast Asia after the Castilian conquest of the Emirate of Granada forced the Spanish speaking Granadan Muslims to migrate across the Muslim world even as far as Islamic Manila.

The ships finally reached the Moluccas on 8 November, when they reached the island of Tidore. They were greeted by the island's leader, al-Mansur (known to the officers by the Spanish name Almanzor). Almanzor was a friendly host to the men, and readily claimed loyalty to the king of Spain. A trading post was established in Tidore and the men set about purchasing massive quantities of cloves in exchange for goods such as cloth, knives, and glassware.

Around 15 December, the ships attempted to set sail from Tidore, laden with cloves. But the Trinidad, which had fallen into disrepair, was found to be taking on water. The departure was postponed while the men, aided by the locals, attempted to find and repair the leak. When these attempts were unsuccessful, it was decided that the Victoria would leave for Spain via a western route, and that the Trinidad would remain behind for some time to be refitted, before heading back to Spain by an eastern route, involving an overland passage across the American continent in the area of the Isthmus of Panama. Several weeks later, Trinidad departed and attempted to return to Spain via the Pacific route. This attempt failed. Trinidad was captured by the Portuguese near Tidore, and was eventually wrecked in a storm while at anchor under Portuguese control.

== Return to Spain ==
The Victoria set sail via the Indian Ocean route home on 21 December 1521, commanded by Juan Sebastián Elcano. By 6 May 1522 the Victoria rounded the Cape of Good Hope, with only rice for rations. Twenty crewmen died of starvation by 9 July 1522, when Elcano put into Portuguese Cape Verde for provisions. The crew was surprised to learn that the date was actually 10 July 1522, a day after their own meticulous records indicated. They had no trouble making purchases at first, using the cover story that they were returning to Spain from the Americas. However, the Portuguese detained 13 crew members after discovering that Victoria was carrying spices from the East Indies. The Victoria managed to escape with its cargo of 26 tons of spices (cloves and cinnamon).

On 6 September 1522, Elcano and the remaining crew of Magellan's voyage arrived in Sanlúcar de Barrameda in Spain aboard Victoria, almost exactly three years after they departed. They then sailed upriver to Seville, and from there overland to Valladolid, where they appeared before the Emperor.

=== Survivors ===
When Victoria, the one surviving ship and the smallest carrack in the fleet, returned to the harbour of departure after completing the first circumnavigation of the Earth, only 18 men out of the original 270 were on board. In addition to the returning Europeans, the Victoria had aboard three Moluccans who came aboard at Tidore.

18 men returned to Seville aboard Victoria in 1522
Name	Origin	Final rank
Juan Sebastián Elcano	Getaria	Captain
Francisco Albo	Chios	Pilot
Miguel de Rodas	Rhodes	Shipmaster
Juan de Acurio	Bermeo	Boatswain
Martín de Judicibus	Savona	Sailor
Hernando de Bustamante	Mérida	Barber surgeon
Antonio Pigafetta	Vicenza	Man-at-arms
Maestre Anes (Hans)	Aachen	Gunner
Diego Gallego	Bayona	Sailor
Antonio Hernández Colmenero	Huelva	Sailor
Nícolas de Napolés	Nafplio	Sailor
Francisco Rodríguez	Sevilla	Sailor
Juan Rodríguez de Huelva	Huelva	Sailor
Miguel de Rodas	Rhodes	Sailor
Juan de Arratía	Bilbao	Shipboy
Juan de Santander (Sant Andrés)	Cueto	Shipboy
Vasco Gómez Gallego	Bayona	Shipboy
Juan de Zubileta	Barakaldo	Page

King Charles pressed for the release of the 12 men held captive by the Portuguese in Cape Verde, and they were eventually returned to Spain in small groups over the course of the following year. They were:

12 men returned to Spain from Cape Verde
Name	Origin	Final rank
Martín Méndez	Sevilla	Scrivener
Pedro de Tolosa	Tolosa	Sailor
Richard de Normandía	Normandy, France	Carpenter
Roldán de Argote	Bruges	Gunner
Felipe de Rodas	Rhodes	Sailor
Gómez Hernández	Huelva	Sailor
Ocacio Alonso	Bollullos	Sailor
Pedro de Chindurza	Galvey	Shipboy
Vasquito Gallego	Bayona	Shipboy
Juan Martín	Bayona	Man-at-arms
Pedro de Tenerife	Tenerife	Man-at-arms
Simon de Burgos	Burgos	Man-at-arms

Between 1525 and 1526, the survivors of the Trinidad, who had been captured by the Portuguese in the Moluccas, were transported to a prison in Portugal and eventually released after a seven-month negotiation. Only five survived:

5 men returning between 1525 and 1526
Name	Origin	Final rank
Ginés de Mafra	Jerez	Sailor
Leone Pancaldo	Genoa	Sailor
Hans Varga (Hans Barge) (Note: A German (before 1500–1527), captured at Tidore 1522 and spent the rest of his life in Portuguese captivity, died in Portugal.)	Germany	Constable
Juan Rodríguez "El Sordo"	Sevilla	Sailor
Gonzalo Gómez de Espinosa	Burgos	Alguacil Mayor

The following five nonsurvivors are considered to have successfully circumnavigated since they died after the Victoria and Trinidad had crossed the tracks of the outbound fleet.

5 men buried at sea after completing the circumnavigation
Name	Origin	Final rank
Diego Garcia de Trigueros	Huelva	Sailor
Pedro de Valpuesta	Burgos	Man-at-arms
Martín de Magallanes	Lisbon	Man-at-arms
Estevan Villon	Trosic, Brittany	Sailor
Andrés Blanco	Tenerife	Shipboy

== Accounts of voyage ==
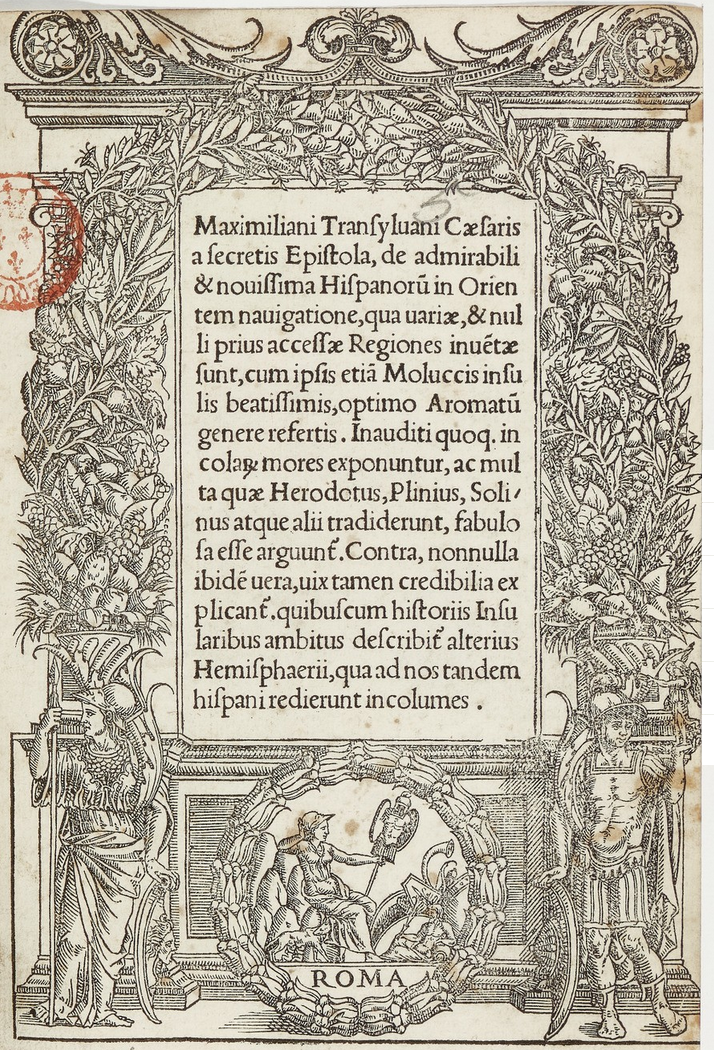
Cover page of Roman edition of Maximilianus Transylvanus's De Moluccis Insulis.... Initially published in Cologne in January 1523, it was the first account of the Magellan expedition to appear in print.

Antonio Pigafetta's journal, later published as Relazione del primo viaggio intorno al mondo, is the main primary source for much of what is known about Magellan's expedition. The first published report of the circumnavigation was a letter written by Maximilianus Transylvanus, a relative of sponsor Cristóbal de Haro, who interviewed survivors in 1522 and published his account in 1523 under the title De Moluccis Insulis.... Initially published in Latin, other editions later appeared in Italian, Spanish, and English.

In addition, there is an extant chronicle from Peter Martyr d'Anghiera, which was written in Spanish in 1522 or 1523, misplaced, then published again in 1530.

Another reliable secondary source is the 1601 chronicle and the longer 1615 version, both by Spanish historian Antonio de Herrera y Tordesillas. Herrera's account is all the more accurate as he had access to Spanish and Portuguese sources that are nowhere to be found today, not least Andrés de San Martín's navigational notes and papers. San Martin, the chief pilot-cosmographer (astronomer) of the Armada, disappeared in the Cebu massacre on 1 May 1521.

In addition to Pigafetta's surviving journal, 11 other crew members kept written accounts of the voyage:

- Francisco Albo: the Victoria's pilot logbook ("Diario ó derrotero"), first referred to in 1788, and first published in its entirety in 1837 and a deposition on 18 October 1522
- Martín de Ayamonte: a short account first published in 1933
- Giovanni Battista: two letters dating from the 21 December 1521 and 25 October 1525 respectively
- Hernando de Bustamante: a deposition on 18 October 1522
- Juan Sebastián Elcano: a letter written on 6 September 1522 and a deposition on 18 October 1522
- Gonzalo Gómez de Espinosa: a letter written on 12 January 1525, a statement on 2 August 1527 and a deposition from the 2nd to the 5 September 1527
- Ginés de Mafra: a detailed account first published in 1920, a statement on 2 August 1527 and a deposition from 2 to 5 September 1527
- Martín Méndez : the Victoria's logbook
- Leone Pancaldo: a long logbook 'by the Genoese pilot' (first published in 1826), a letter written on 25 October 1525, a statement on 2 August 1527 and a deposition from 2 to 5 September 1527
- an anonymous Portuguese crew member: a long manuscript, first published in 1937, known as "the Leiden manuscript", possibly written by Gonzalo Gómez de Espinosa and, in all likelihood, a Trinidad crew member
- and another anonymous Portuguese crew member: a very short account, first published in 1554, written by a Trinidad crew member

== Legacy ==
=== Subsequent expeditions ===
Since there was not a set limit to the east, in 1524 both Portugal and Spain had tried to find the exact location of the antimeridian of Tordesillas, which would divide the world into two equal hemispheres and to resolve the "Moluccas issue." A board met several times without reaching an agreement: the knowledge at that time was insufficient for an accurate calculation of longitude, and each gave the islands to their sovereign.

In 1525, soon after the return of Magellan's expedition, Charles V sent an expedition led by García Jofre de Loaísa to occupy the Moluccas, claiming that they were in his zone of the Treaty of Tordesillas. This expedition included the most notable Spanish navigators, including Juan Sebastián Elcano (who, along with many other sailors, died during the voyage) and the young Andrés de Urdaneta. They had difficulty reaching the Moluccas, docking at Tidore. The Portuguese were already established in nearby Ternate and the two nations had nearly a decade of skirmishing over the possession, which was still occupied by indigenous people. An agreement was reached only with the Treaty of Zaragoza, signed in 1529 between Spain and Portugal. It assigned the Moluccas to Portugal and the Philippines to Spain.

In 1565, Andrés de Urdaneta discovered the Manila-Acapulco route.

The course that Magellan charted was later followed by other navigators, such as Sir Francis Drake during his circumnavigation in 1578, in the process discovering a different route around the tip of South America, the "Drake Passage".

=== Scientific accomplishments ===
Magellan's expedition was the first to circumnavigate the globe and the first to navigate the strait in South America connecting the Atlantic and the Pacific oceans. Magellan's name for the Pacific was adopted by other Europeans.

Magellan's crew observed several animals that were entirely new to European science, including a "camel without humps", which was probably a guanaco, whose range extends to Tierra del Fuego. The llama, vicuña and alpaca natural ranges were in the Andes mountains. Pigafetta's account included a "black goose" that had to be skinned instead of plucked — it was a penguin.

The full extent of the globe was realised, since their voyage was 14,460 Spanish leagues (60,440 km or 37,560 mi). The global expedition showed the need for an International Date Line to be established. Upon arrival at Cape Verde, the crew was surprised to learn that the ship's date of 9 July 1522 was one day behind the local date of 10 July 1522, even though they had recorded every day of the three-year journey without omission. They lost one day because they travelled west during their circumnavigation of the globe, in the same direction as the apparent motion of the sun across the sky. Although the Kurdish geographer Abu'l-Fida (1273–1331) had predicted that circumnavigators would accumulate a one-day offset, Cardinal Gasparo Contarini was the first European to give a correct explanation of the discrepancy.

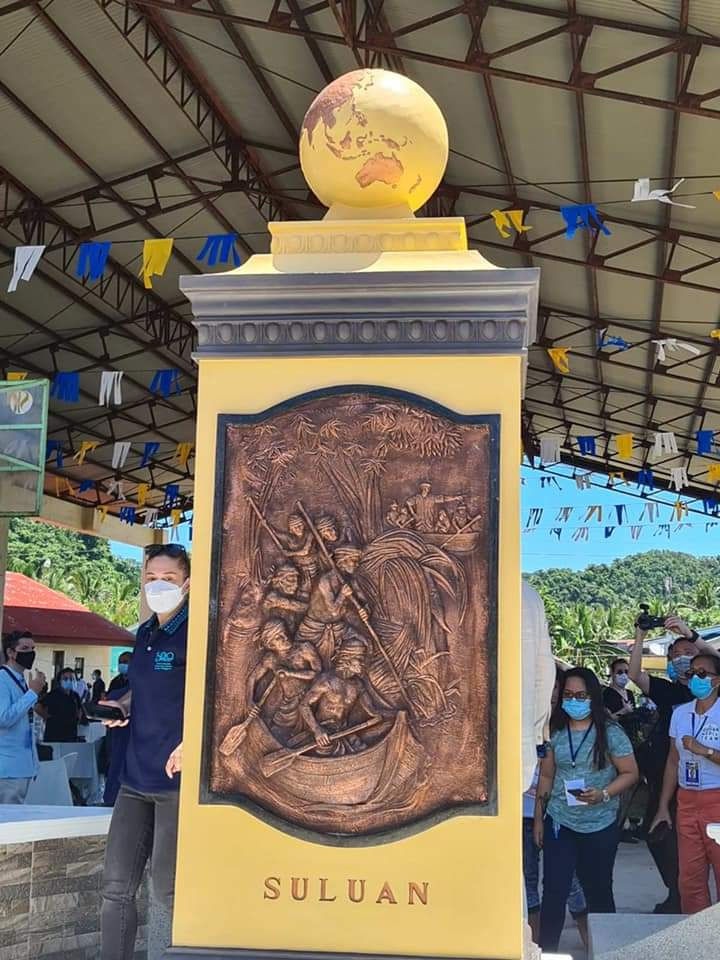
Quincentennial historical marker of the arrival at Suluan, Guiuan, Eastern Samar, Philippines

=== Quincentenary ===
In 2017, Portugal submitted an application to UNESCO to honour the circumnavigation route; the proposal was for a World Heritage Site called "Route of Magellan."

In 2019, a number of events marked the 500th anniversary of the voyage, including exhibitions in various Spanish cities.

To commemorate the 500th anniversary of Magellan's arrival in the Philippines, the National Quincentennial Committee put up monuments to mark the points where the fleet anchored.

== See also ==
- Age of Discovery
- Timeline of the Magellan expedition
- Chronology of European exploration of Asia
- History of the Philippines
- Military history of the Philippines
- Spanish colonization attempt of the Strait of Magellan
- Spanish Empire
- Magallanica, hypothetical continent south of the Strait of Magellan
