= Bergantina =

14th-16th century ship

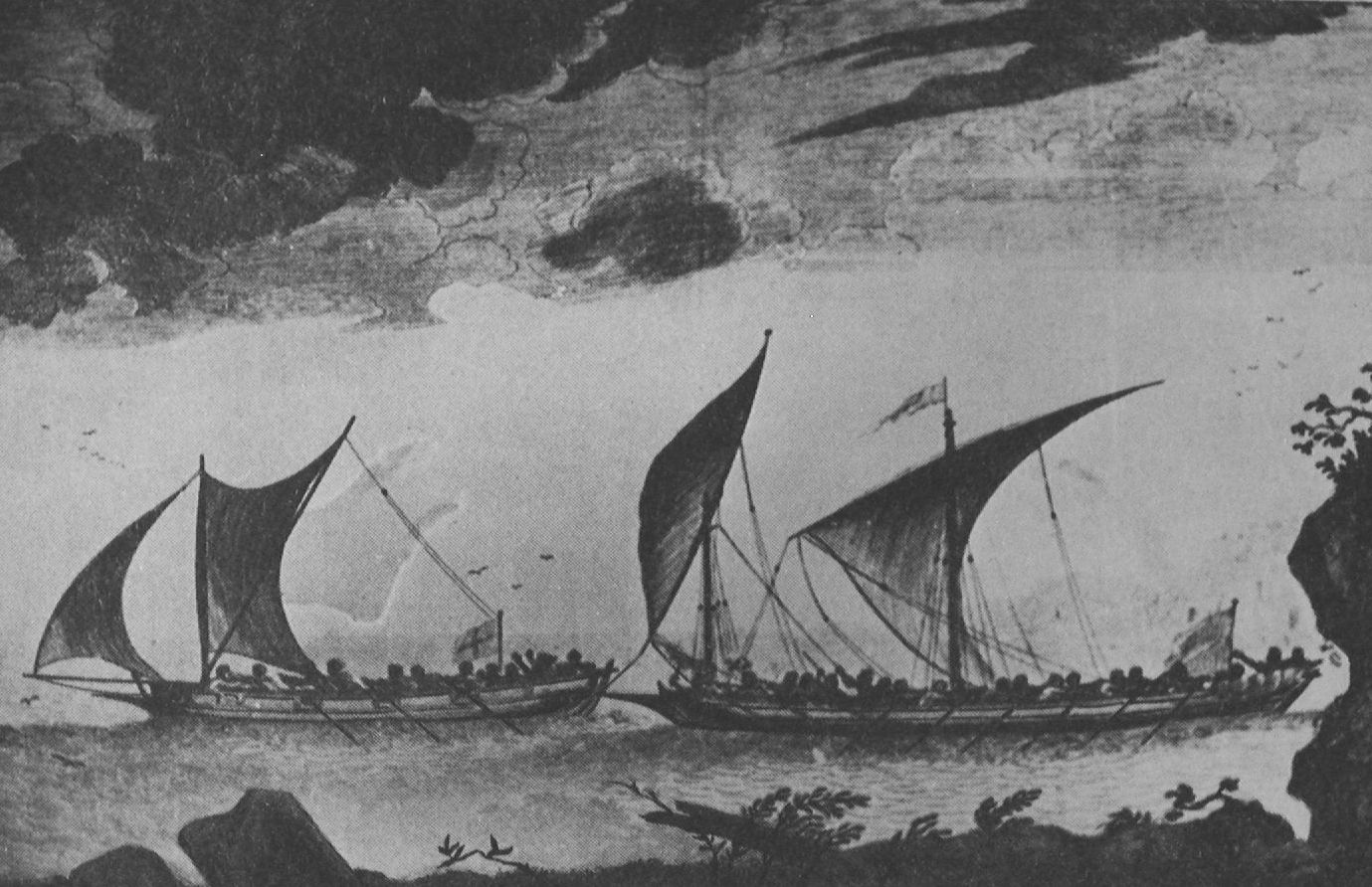
Painting depicting a bergantina (right) and a felucca (left). ca. 1700

A bergantina (or bergantym) was a type of small ship powered by oars and sails, popular in the Mediterranean between the 14th and 16th century. The bergantina was a flat-bottomed ship with one or two masts carrying lateen sails and capacity for eight to sixteen rowers. Measuring no more than 40 feet in length, it was a popular ship's boat during the Age of Exploration. Many Spanish and Portuguese explorers, including Christopher Columbus and Ferdinand Magellan, carried bergantinas on their voyages, for landing, surveying, and shuttling men and supplies between ships.
