= João Serrão =

Explorer

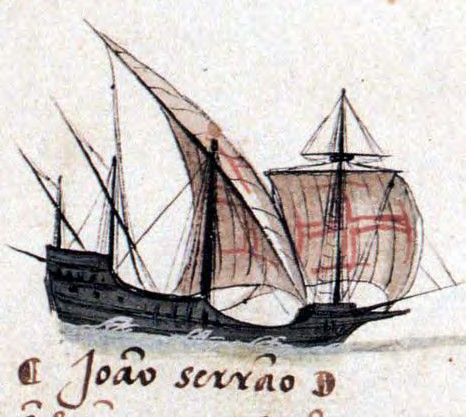
A caravel listed as under Serrão's command in the 2nd squadron of the 1502 Fourth India Armada, from the 1566 Livro des Armadas

João Rodrigues Serrão (d. May 1521), also known as Juan Rodríguez Serrano, was a Portuguese and Spanish pilot and explorer. He served in the Portuguese India Armadas that secured control of the Indian Ocean and the Strait of Malacca for the Portuguese but is most well known for his participation in Ferdinand Magellan's 1519–1521 expedition to the Spice Islands for Charles I of Spain, which discovered a path around South America to the Pacific and initiated Spanish involvement in the Philippines. Serrão and Duarte Barbosa became leaders of the expedition after Magellan's death at the Battle of Mactan but did not live to complete the circumnavigation with Elcano. They were both killed shortly thereafter during a massacre of the Spanish by their supposed convert and ally Humabon, raja of Cebu.

== Name ==
João Rodrigues Serrão is the Portuguese form of the Spanish name Juan Rodríguez Serrano and more common in English sources, although Antonio Pigafetta—a Venetian who accompanied Magellan's expedition as a supernumerary and subsequently wrote an account of his voyage—considered Serrão notably Spanish. The name is usually shortened to Serrão rather than Rodrigues Serrão. It also appears in some sources anglicized to John Serrano.

== Life ==
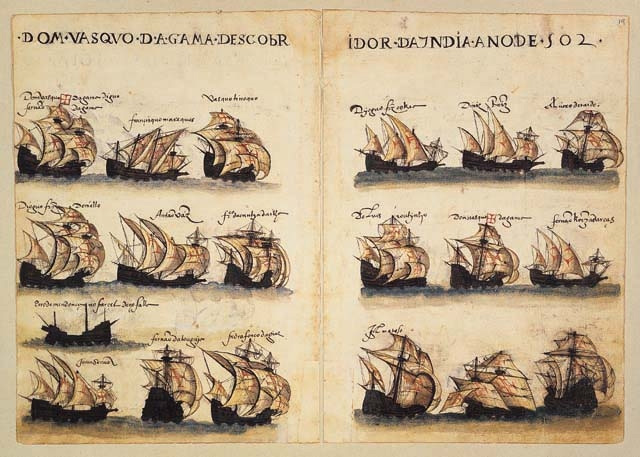
The Fourth India Armada (1502) from the c. 1565 Livro de Lisuarte de Abreu

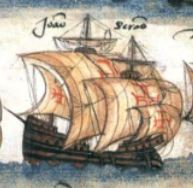
The Botafogo, Serrão's ship in the Seventh India Armada (1505), from the Livro de Lisuarte

Serrão was born in Frixinal (now Fregenal de la Sierra), Badajoz, in a border area long contested between Portugal and Spain. He was the brother or cousin of Francisco Serrão.

Like Magellan, for the first part of his life, João Serrão served the Portuguese king Manuel I. He served as the pilot of a round caravel in the Fourth India Armada led by Vasco de Gama in 1502. Together with Magellan and his relative Francisco, he also took part in the Seventh India Armada led by Francisco de Almeida in 1505. In that expedition, he captained the round caravel Botafogo. Serrão and Magellan also took part in the Portuguese conquest of Malacca led by Afonso de Albuquerque in 1511.

Subsequently, Francisco stayed in the East Indies and wrote descriptions of the area to João and Magellan. Finding himself in disgrace in the Portuguese court and thinking Francisco's information suggested the Spice Islands (now Indonesia's Maluku Islands) fell within the Spanish hemisphere created by the Treaty of Tordesillas, Magellan approached the young Spanish king Charles I (subsequently Emperor Charles V of the Holy Roman Empire) for funding. When this was granted, Serrão joined Magellan as one of the captains for his expedition.

Serrão captained the Santiago across the Atlantic in 1519. After an attempted mutiny that led to the execution or flight of the three other captains, he subsequently commanded the Concepción across the Pacific in 1520. Magellan had hoped to meet Francisco Serrão when he arrived in the Spice Islands but, after the First Mass in the Philippines, he was killed at the 1521 Battle of Mactan while attempting to shore up the power of his convert and ally Humabon, the raja of Cebu. Upon his death, Serrão became joint leader of the expedition with Magellan's in-law Duarte Barbosa. (Francisco Serrão died shortly thereafter on Ternate.)

Magellan's will had provided for the freeing of his Malay slave Enrique. Either Barbosa or Barbosa and Serrão together refused to honor this provision, preferring to keep Enrique as their Malay interpreter for the rest of the mission and to return him later to Portugal as the property of Magellan's widow Beatriz Barbosa. Subsequently, probably though not certainly by Enrique's doing, Humabon massacred the Spanish leadership at a feast on Cebu on 1 May 1521 and drove them from his lands, with Enrique surviving and escaping captivity. Serrão also survived the initial trap and reached the island's beach, where he called to the men still on the boats for rescue. João Lopes Carvalho, who became leader of the expedition at this point, feared that the Cebuanos were only using Serrão as bait to lure more men into the massacre and ordered his men not to go to shore. Serrão seems to have been recaptured and killed shortly afterward.
