= Rolando Laguarda Trías =

Uruguayan historian (1902–1998)

Rolando Laguarda Trías (1902–1999) was a Uruguayan historian. He was recognized both nationally and internationally for his work in the fields of geography, historical cartography, military history, lexicography and etymology. He was born and died in Montevideo.

== Works ==
Several of his publications are used as a reference for researchers internationally. Among these are:

- The enigma of the traveler Acarette du Biscay (1958)
- The expedition of Christopher Jaques the Rio de la Plata in 1521 (1964)
- Afronegrismos River Plate (1969)
- The prediscovery the Rio de la Plata by the Portuguese expedition of 1511-1512 (1973)
- Basis for a glossary of geographical terms in Uruguay (1974)
- El Enigma De Las Latitudes De Colon (Cuadernos colombinos, 4.) (1974)
- Breakthrough of the Rio de la Plata by Amerigo Vespucci in 1502 (1983)
- Spanish ship discovered the Falkland Islands in 1520 (1983)
- Notes on Spanish military engineers in the Banda Oriental (1991)
- Crew, endowments and latitudes of the Magellan expedition Elcano (1997)
- Introduction to cartography portolan (PM 1999)
