= Gaspar de Quesada =

Spanish explorer (died 1520)

Gaspar de Quesada (died April 7, 1520) was a Spanish explorer who participated in Magellan's circumnavigation as captain of the Concepción, one of the expedition's five ships. Approximately six months in to the expedition, Quesada, with two other Spanish captains, attempted to overthrow Magellan in the Easter mutiny at the South American port of St. Julian. The mutiny failed and Magellan had Quesada executed.

== Magellan expedition ==
Little is known of Quesada's life before the Magellan expedition. A letter to Manuel I of Portugal from consul Sebastião Alvares described Quesada as "a servant of the Archbishop [of Seville]". Charles I of Spain wrote that he had been "informed about his reputation and abilities".

Quesada was appointed as captain by the archbishop Juan Rodríguez de Fonseca (leader of the Casa de Contratación), along with the expedition's other two Spanish captains, Juan de Cartagena and Luis Mendoza. These three captains despised Magellan, the expedition's Portuguese captain-general, and would go on to be the architects of the Easter mutiny.

The expedition left Spain September 20, 1519, sailing west for South America. During a stop at the Canary Islands, Magellan received a secret message from his father-in-law, Diogo Barbosa, warning him that the Spanish captains were planning to mutiny. Later, during the Atlantic crossing, following the trial of a sailor caught in an act of sodomy, Magellan met with his captains to discuss their route. During the meeting, Cartagena became increasingly disrespectful to Magellan, eventually declaring he would no longer take orders from the captain-general. At this, Magellan grabbed Cartagena and declared him under arrest. In response, Cartagena called on Quesada and Mendoza to retaliate against Magellan (an incitement to mutiny). Quesada and Mendoza held back. After the confrontation, Cartagena was briefly put in stocks, but Quesada and Mendoza persuaded Magellan to release Cartagena, and allow him to be confined to the Victoria (under command of Mendoza).

The expedition landed at Rio de Janeiro December 1519, where they stayed for two weeks. After an incident in which Cartagena was allowed to leave the Victoria to come ashore (possibly to join in the orgiastic celebrations taking place with the natives, or as part of another mutiny plot), Magellan considered marooning Cartagena, but instead had him transferred into the custody of Quesada aboard the Concepción.

After leaving Rio de Janeiro in late 1519, the fleet sailed south along the coast for three months, searching for a passage around or through the continent. When the weather conditions became intolerable, the fleet anchored on March 31, 1520, at a natural harbor they called Saint Julian, located in modern-day Argentina. There they planned to wait out the winter before resuming their search for a strait.

=== Easter mutiny ===
Along with Juan de Cartagena and Luis Mendoza, Quesada was one of the principal architects of the Easter mutiny at St. Julian which took place from April 1 to 2, 1520. The mutiny began around midnight of April 1, when Quesada and Cartagena covertly led thirty armed men aboard the San Antonio, moving from the Concepción in a skiff. They seized control of the San Antonio, with Quesada stabbing and mortally wounding Juan de Elorriaga, the ship's master, who resisted the mutineers. Quesada declared himself captain of the San Antonio, with Cartagena returning to command the Concepción. With the Victoria commanded by Mendoza, the mutineers controlled three of the fleet's five ships.

Magellan successfully fought back against the mutineers, first by having Mendoza killed and taking control of the Victoria, then blocking the harbor to prevent the Concepción and San Antonio from escaping.

Quesada apparently intended to flee at dawn on April 3, 1520, but before daybreak, the San Antonio had drifted close to Magellan's flagship, the Trinidad, and a boarding party was able to board the San Antonio, where they found Quesada roaming the quarterdeck in full armor, carrying a lance and shield. Quesada and his co-conspirators were arrested, and the remaining crew of the San Antonio pledged allegiance to Magellan. Differing explanations have been offered for why the San Antonio fell into Magellan's lap, including:

- A strong ebb tide
- Wanting to get a quick start at dawn, Quesada raised three of the ship's four anchors. The single remaining anchor was insufficient to prevent the ship from drifting.
- Other accounts claim that Magellan sent a single sailor in a skiff to the San Antonio to cut its anchor cable. He may have been allowed aboard because he claimed to be a defector, or by Magellan loyalists on the San Antonio.

== Death ==
Following the Easter mutiny, Magellan held a court martial, sentencing Quesada to death (the other surviving Spanish captain, Juan de Cartagena, was sentenced to be marooned). Unable to find a volunteer executioner, Magellan offered to commute the sentence of Quesada's squire, Luis Molino, if he would perform the duty. Molino agreed, and on April 7, 1520, Quesada was beheaded. His and Mendoza's bodies were quartered and the parts impaled and displayed on gibbets as a warning. Later, Sir Francis Drake reportedly found the gibbets when he tried and executed Thomas Doughty at St. Julian in 1578.
