= Concepción (carrack) =

Spanish ship on the Magellan expedition

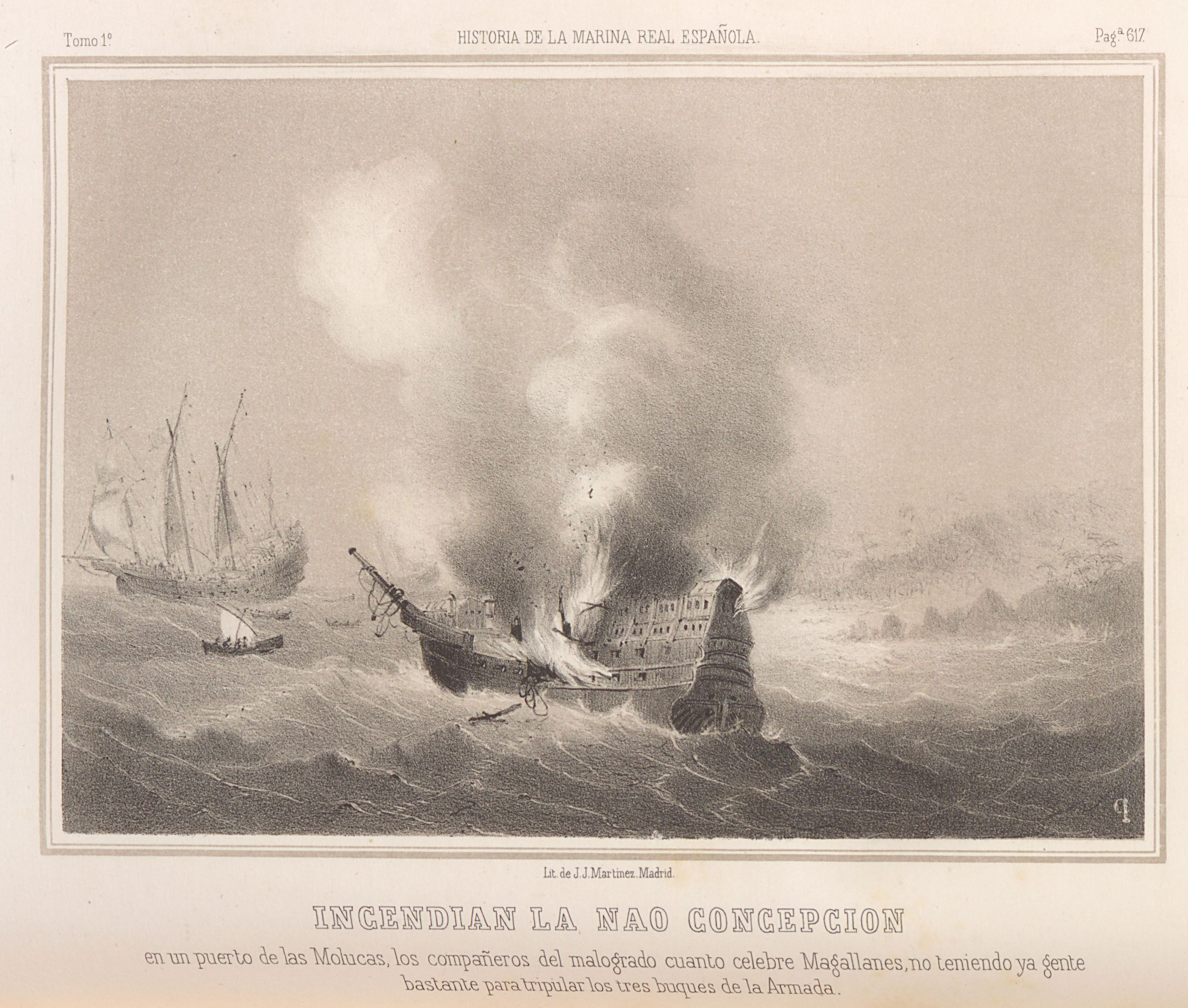
- Burning of the Nao Concepción, 1854 lithograph

History

Spain
- Owner: Crown of Spain
- Fate: Purposely burned in 1521
- Notes: Part of the Magellan expedition

General characteristics
- Type: Nao
- Tonnage: 90 tonels (approx. 54 shipping tons) (Note: Note that many English sources such as Joyner provide these numbers calqued as "tons" without converting their values from the actual unit, the Biscayan tonel ("tun"). At the time of Magellan's voyage, this tonel was reckoned as 1.2 toneladas, giving the Concepción a capacity of roughly 108 toneladas, 153 m³, 5400 cu. ft., or 54 English shipping tons.)

The Concepción (Spanish for "Conception") was an early 16th-century Spanish carrack during the Age of Discovery, chiefly remembered as part of the five-ship Molucca Fleet (Armada de Molucca) that undertook the historic 1519–1522 Magellan expedition.

Departing Spain on September 20, 1519, the expedition attempted to find a route around South America to the Malukus, or Spice Islands, in present-day Indonesia. The expedition accomplished this goal, and also completed the first circumnavigation of Earth in history. However, the Concepción itself did not finish the voyage, and was scuttled in the Philippines on May 2, 1521, shortly after Ferdinand Magellan himself died in the Battle of Mactan.

== History ==
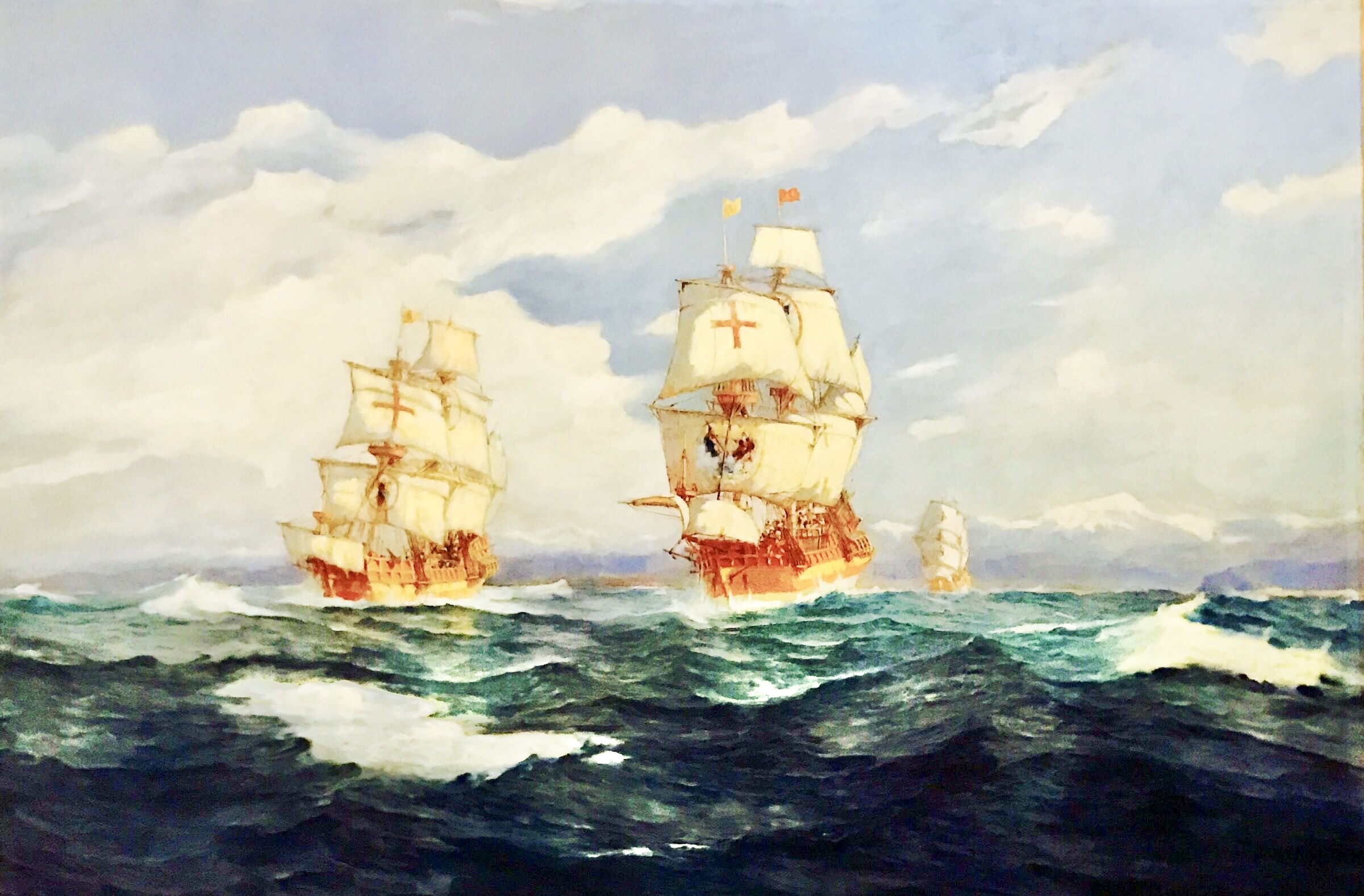
The fleet discovers the Straits of Magellan. Painting by Álvaro Casanova Zenteno, 1925.

The Concepción held 90 tonels (Note: Note that many English sources such as Joyner provide these numbers calqued as "tons" without converting their values from the actual unit, the Biscayan tonel ("tun"). At the time of Magellan's voyage, this tonel was reckoned as 1.2 toneladas, giving the Concepción a capacity of roughly 108 toneladas, 153 m³, 5400 cu. ft., or 54 English shipping tons.) and cost 228,750 maravedís (Note: Spanish currency was extremely complicated during this period but the maravedí unit of account was usually reckoned as 1/375 of the Spanish ducat, making the cost of the Concepción equivalent to the value of about 2125 grams of pure gold.) to construct. Leaving Seville on August 10, 1519, the Concepción's crew consisted of 44 men under Captain Gaspar de Quesada. Juan Sebastián Elcano was its boatswain. Along with the rest of the fleet, Concepción sailed through the Straits of Magellan in October and November 1520. João Serrão commanded the ship across the Pacific, and became joint leader of the expedition after Ferdinand Magellan's death during a 1521 raid on Mactan Island, whose leader Lapulapu had refused to convert or pay tribute. When Elcano then joined Duarte Barbosa in refusing to free Magellan's Malay slave Enrique, Enrique convinced the Cebu raja Humabon to massacre the Spanish. However, other sources say that the Cebu raja Humabon decided to poison the Spanish because they did attempt to rape the native women. With too few men and supplies to keep it repaired and manned, and its hull infested by worms, the expedition's new leader João Lopes Carvalho ordered the Concepción, the least seaworthy, to be abandoned and burnt. The burning took place on May 2, 1521.

Elcano would subsequently lead the Victoria back to Seville, becoming the first ship to circumnavigate the globe.
