= Juan de Cartagena =

Spanish explorer

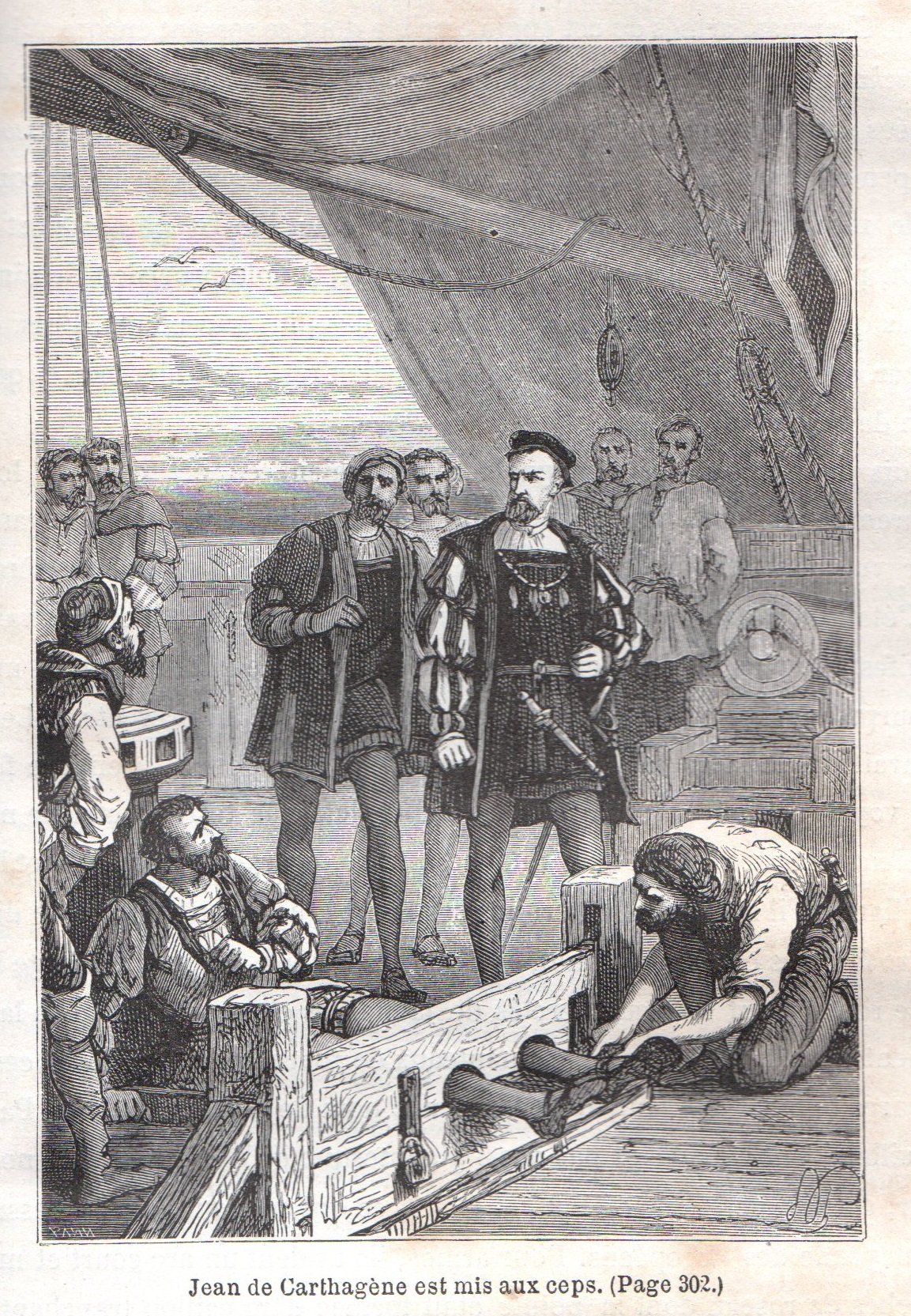
- Mutineer Cartagena placed into stocks. Engraving c. 1909.
- Born: Castile
- Died: c. 1520; Patagonia
- Known for: Captaincy of a vessel in the Magellan expedition and ringleader of a mutiny in 1520

Juan de Cartagena (died c. 1520) was a Spanish aristocrat who served on the Magellan expedition as the inspector general of the fleet and captain of one of the five ships sent by Spain to find a western route to Asia. Cartagena frequently argued with Magellan during the voyage and questioned his authority. Following a failed mutiny attempt of which Cartagena was the principal organizer, Magellan marooned Cartagena on a remote island in Patagonia in 1520, before continuing on to the Strait of Magellan.

== Early life ==
Little is known about Cartagena's background. He was probably born in Burgos, the historic capital of Old Castile. Cartagena was a confidante and "nephew" of archbishop Juan Rodríguez de Fonseca, the influential head of the Casa de Contratación which regulated trade with Spain’s American colonies. Some historians have interpreted "nephew" as a euphemism indicating that Cartagena was Fonseca's illegitimate son. His age at the time of Magellan's expedition is unknown, but he was married and had a daughter, Doña Catalina.

== Magellan's voyage ==
Cartagena had no experience as a seaman. Despite this, he used his influence with Fonseca to secure appointment as Inspector General (Veedor General) of Magellan's Armada de Molucca with authority to supervise the expedition's financial and trading operations. King Charles V of Spain also directed Cartagena to report on the expedition directly, rather than through Magellan as captain-general. This split responsibility would be a source of difficulty during the subsequent voyage.

In recognition of Cartagena's influence, and in order to please his supporters, Magellan named him captain of the largest ship of the expedition, the San Antonio, subject only to Magellan's own authority as captain-general of the fleet. Cartagena earned a salary of 110,000 maravedí, the highest of anyone in the fleet, including Magellan.

Tensions surfaced between Cartagena and Magellan as soon as the fleet departed Spain. In councils between captains, Cartagena routinely opposed Magellan's navigation decisions and refused to salute his superior when required by custom to do so. A storm delayed the fleet south of Tenerife, and food had to be rationed; Cartagena took this opportunity to publicly criticise Magellan and suggest he was not competent to command. Magellan promptly had him arrested, relieved of his command and confined aboard the Victoria for the remainder of the voyage to South America.

=== Mutiny ===
Cartagena remained a captive until the fleet reached Patagonia. On 1 April 1520 he secretly left the Victoria and reboarded the San Antonio, where he rallied supporters among the Spanish crew and officers in opposition to the Portuguese Magellan. In company with Concepción's captain Gaspar de Quesada, pilot Juan Sebastián Elcano and thirty Spanish crew members, Cartagena seized control of San Antonio and declared the vessel independent of Magellan's command. The officers of both Concepción and Victoria joined in the mutiny, and on 2 April 1520 a letter was sent to Magellan's flagship, the Trinidad, demanding that the captain-general acknowledge that the fleet was no longer under his command.

Magellan brought the Trinidad alongside Victoria and lowered a boat to carry back his reply. When the boat crew reached Victoria's deck, they made a pretense of handing over a letter; when Victoria's captain sought to take it, the boat crew stabbed him to death. Simultaneously, fifteen men from Magellan's ship climbed aboard and attacked the mutineers. Victoria's crew joined their cause and the ship was seized.

Cartagena had relocated to Concepción prior to the battle, and so remained temporarily free. However, only that vessel and San Antonio remained in the mutineers' hands. Magellan ranged his three ships across the mouth of the bay in which the fleet had anchored, and cleared the decks for engagement with Cartagena's two vessels. In strong winds overnight on 2 April, San Antonio dragged its anchor and drifted helplessly toward Trinidad. Magellan ordered a broadside fired, at which the crew of San Antonio surrendered and allowed the vessel to be retaken. Realising the mutiny had failed, on 3 April Cartagena followed suit and surrendered Concepción without resistance.

== Death ==
After the mutiny, Magellan held a trial of the conspirators. Cartagena's ally Gaspar de Quesada (captain of the Concepción) was sentenced to death by beheading. However, Magellan was reluctant to execute a close relative of Fonseca, so Cartagena was sentenced to be marooned along with another conspirator, the priest Pedro Sánchez de la Reina. The sentence was carried out on 11 August 1520, four months after the mutiny, shortly before the fleet departed their winter quarters at San Julián. Cartagena and the priest were given a small supply of ship's biscuits and drinking water and left on a small island off the Patagonian coast. Neither was seen or heard from again.

== Bibliography ==
- Beaglehole, J.C. (1968). The Exploration of the Pacific. Stanford University Press. ISBN 9780804703109.
- Bergreen, Laurence (2003). Over the Edge of the World. Harper Perennial. ISBN 0066211735.
- Cameron, Ian (1974). Magellan and the first circumnavigation of the world. London: Weidenfeld & Nicolson. ISBN 029776568X. OCLC 842695.
- Joyner, Tim (1992), Magellan, Camden, Me: International Marine, ISBN 087742263X
- Krom, Cynthia L. (2012), Juan de Cartagena: Accountant and Mutineer, Franklin & Marshall College, Pennsylvania, USA
