= Luis de Mendoza (explorer) =

Spanish explorer

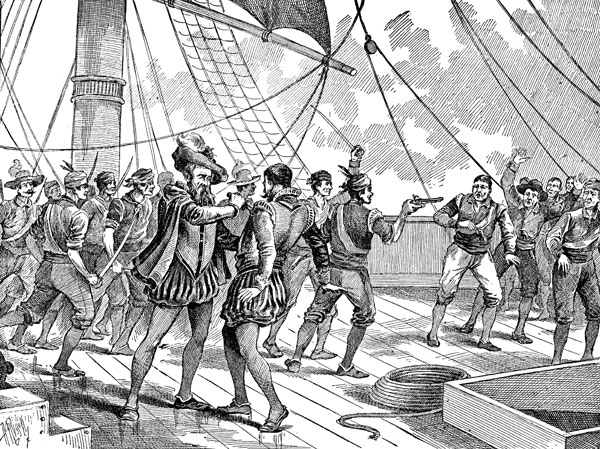
Artist's depiction of Mendoza's death by stabbing during the attempted mutiny against Ferdinand Magellan while overwintering in Patagonia in 1520.

Luis de Mendoza (died 2 April 1520) was a Spanish mariner and explorer.

== Biography ==
Mendoza was a member of Magellan's circumnavigation of the world, the initial captain of the Victoria. He was appointed by Charles I of Spain on March 30, 1519 as treasurer of the navy "for the discovery of the Spices", that had the purpose of finding a route to the Spice Islands within the limits of the Spanish demarcation to the Spice Islands. These limits had been agreed with Portugal in the Treaty of Tordesillas of 1494, establishing a line of demarcation that divided the world between both crowns.

He was killed while leading a mutiny against Magellan in Patagonia, stabbed to death in the throat and head by a Magellan loyalist.
