= Jacques-Nicolas Bellin =

French hydrographer, geographer and philosophe (1703–1772)

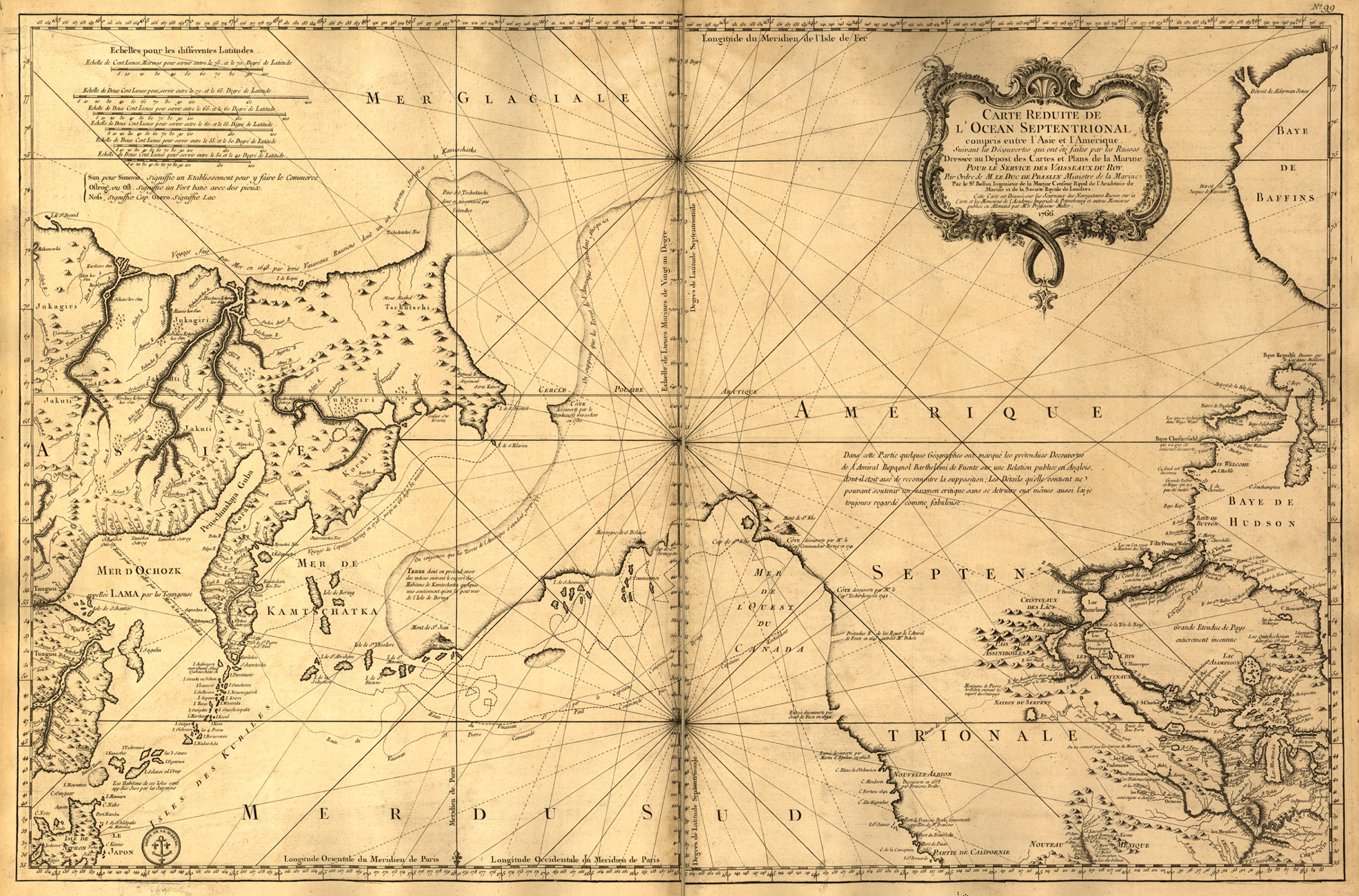
Jacques-Nicolas Bellin: Carte réduite de l'océan septentrional..., from: L'hydrographie françoise, Paris 1766

Jacques Nicolas Bellin (French pronunciation: [ʒak nikɔla bɛlɛ̃]; 1703 – 21 March 1772) was a French hydrographer, geographer, and member of the French intellectual group called the "philosophes".

Bellin was born in Paris. He was hydrographer of France's hydrographic office, member of the Académie de Marine and of the Royal Society of London. Over a 50-year career, he produced many maps of particular interest to the Ministère de la Marine. His maps of Canada and of French territories in North America (New France, Acadia, Louisiana) are particularly valuable. He died at Versailles.

== First Ingenieur de la Marine ==
In 1721, at age 18, he was appointed hydrographer (chief cartographer) to the French Navy. In August 1741, he became the first Ingénieur de la Marine of the Dépot des cartes et plans de la Marine (the French Hydrographical Office) and was named Official Hydrographer of the French King.

== Prodigious work, high standard of excellence ==
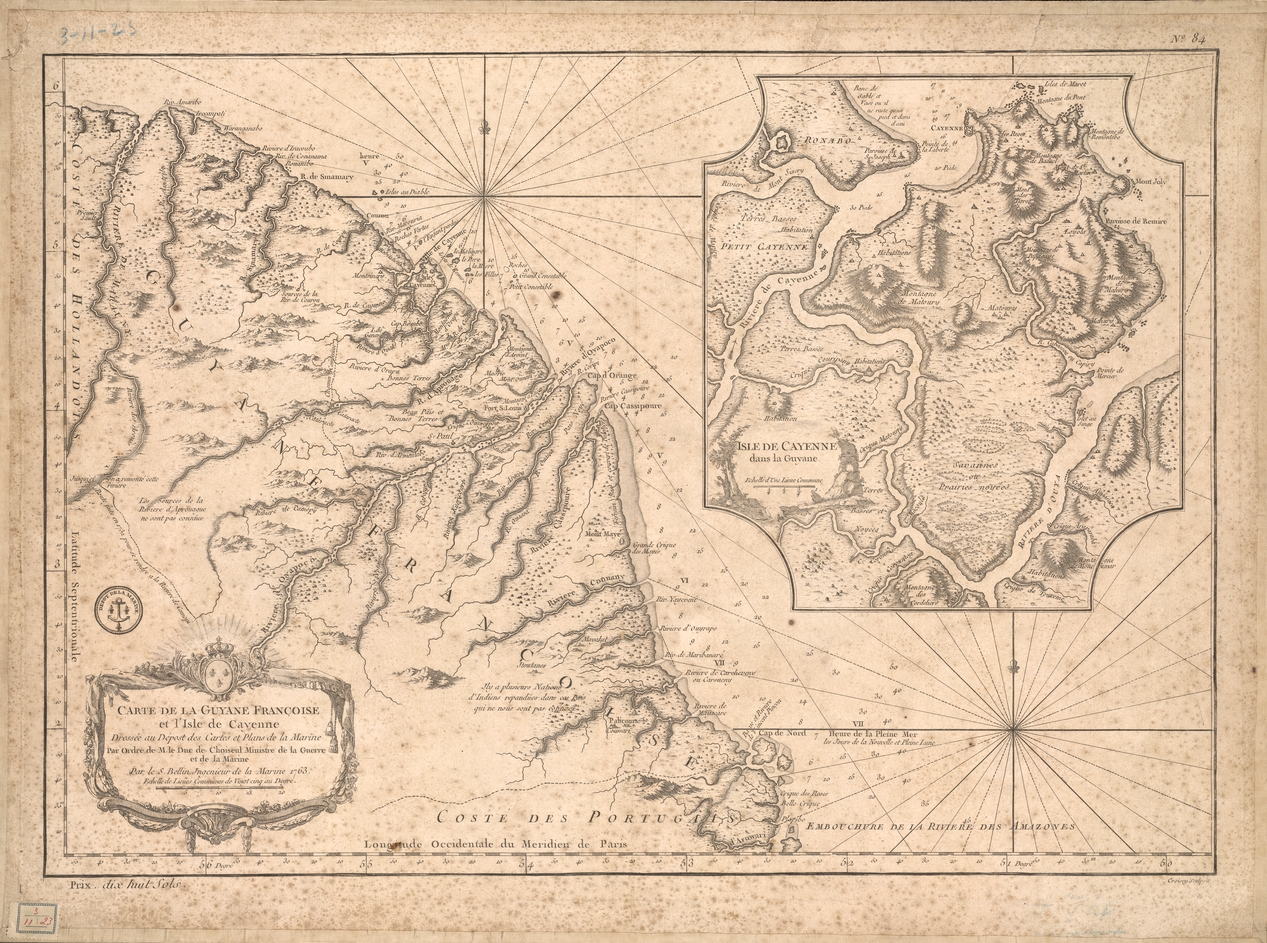
Carte de la Guyane françoise et l'isle de Cayenne, 1763 CE, by Bellin

During his reign, the Depot published a prodigious number of charts and maps, among which were large folio-format sea-charts of France, the Neptune Francois. He also produced a number of sea-atlases of the world, e.g., the Atlas Maritime and the Hydrographie Francaise. These gained fame, distinction and respect all over Europe and were republished throughout the 18th and even in the succeeding century.

Bellin also created smaller format maps such as the 1764 Petit Atlas Maritime (5 vols.) containing 580 finely detailed charts.

Bellin set a very high standard of workmanship and accuracy thus gaining for France a leading role in European cartography and geography. Many of his maps were copied by other mapmakers of Europe.

== Member of philosophes ==
He was one of the Encyclopédistes, a group of 18th century intellectuals in France who compiled the 35-volume Encyclopédie which was edited by Denis Diderot and Jean le Rond d'Alembert. Bellin contributed 994 articles.

The Encyclopédistes, were part of the group called philosophes among whose members were the great minds of the Age of Enlightenment, e.g., Montesquieu, Voltaire, Rousseau, Baron d'Holbach.

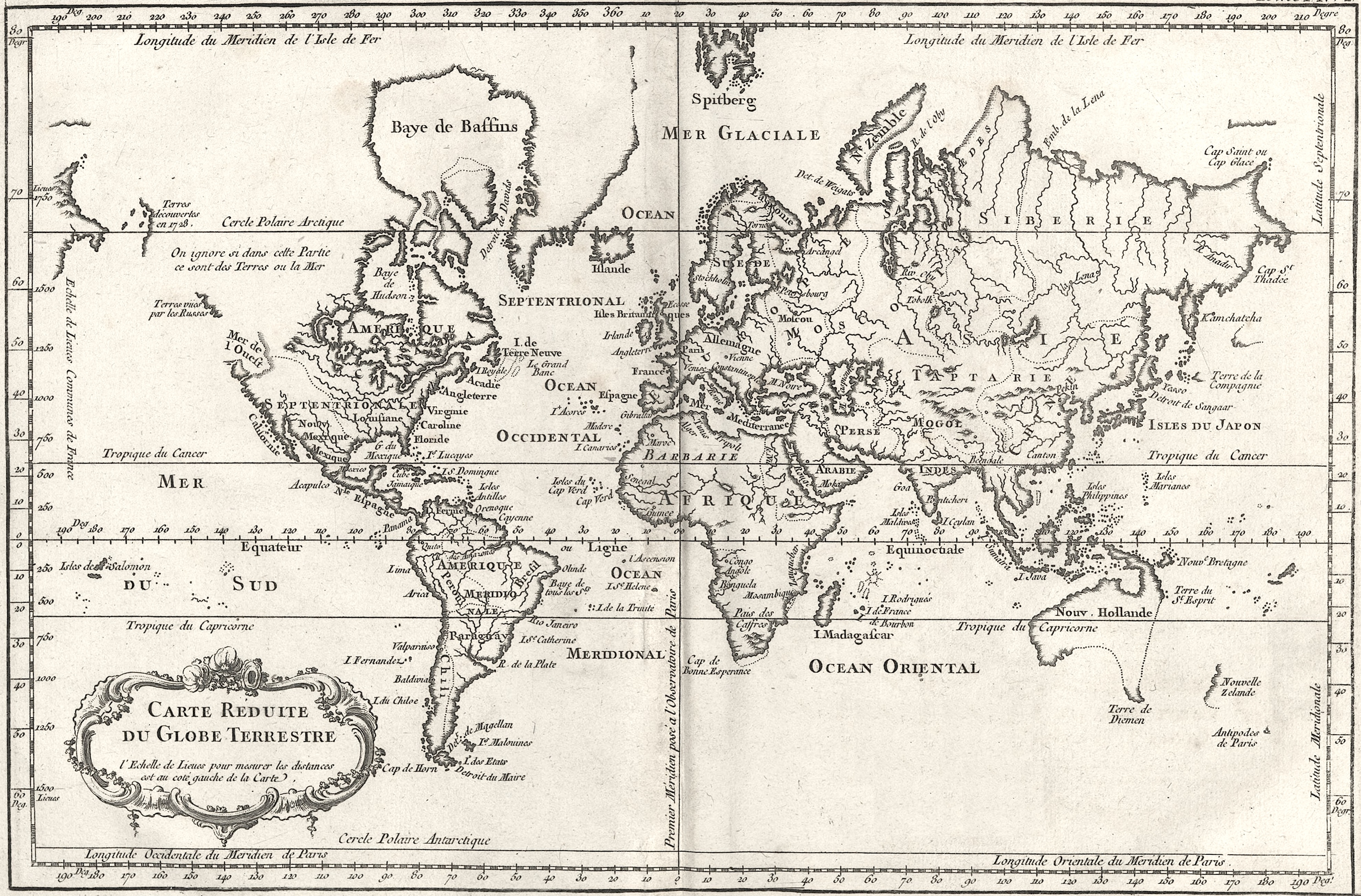
This 1764 map of the world, by French hydrographer Jacques-Nicolas Bellin, shows the major landmasses known to Europeans in the 1760s. Unknown areas included Alaska, the east coast of Australia, and the west coast of Canada.

== Innocent party to a geographical error ==
Bellin contributed a number of maps to 15-vol. Histoire Générale des Voyages of Antoine François Prévost or simply known l'Abbé Prevost. One of these maps led to a geographical blunder whose impact reverberates to this day. This was the map of the Philippines which Bellin copied from a world-famous chart produced in 1734 by the Spanish missionary to the Philippines, Fr. Pedro Murillo Velarde.

Unlike many other European mapmakers of the time who outright appropriated Murillo's map, Bellin had the intellectual integrity to fully credit Murillo as his source, an open acknowledgement shown in the title cartouche of Bellin's map which came out the same year as the original work by Murillo.

Shown in Bellin's map was an island named "Limasava", a word invented in 1667 by Spanish friar, Fr. Francisco Combés, S.J., to refer to the way station of the Armada de Molucca under the command of the Portuguese captain-general Fernao de Magalhaes during its navigation in Philippine waters. Combés, who had not read a single eyewitness account of the Magellan expedition relied on two sources, the hopelessly garbled Italian translation of the Antonio Pigafetta account by Giovanni Battista Ramusio and the secondhand account by Antonio de Herrera y Tordesillas. Ramusio wrote the fleet anchored in March–April 1521 in Butuan in Mindanao, and from there sailed for Cebu with a brief stopover at "Messana". In the authentic Pigafetta account, the port was an isle named Mazzaua while the stopover isle was named Gatighan. Antonio de Herrera y Tordesillas gave a faithful narration of the Mazzaua anchorage.

Combés disregarded de Herrera's version and adopted Ramusio's. He wrote that Magellan's fleet had anchored at Butuan and from there sailed for Cebu making a stop at a way station he named Limasaua.

Five years earlier than Combés, Fr. Francisco Colín wrote the Armada moored at Butuan from March–April 1521 where Magellan and his men together with the natives celebrated an Easter Sunday mass on 31 March 1521. From Butuan the fleet sailed for Cebu making a brief stop at a way station he called "Dimasaua", an invented word meaning "this is not the Mazagua of Antonio de Herrera where supposedly an Easter Sunday mass was held which I already said happened in Butuan."

This episode was projected in the 1734 map made by Murillo who used Combés name, "Limassava" not "Dimasaua" which map Bellin copied.

== Gatighan becomes Limasava ==
In 1789, Augustinian Carlo Amoretti, Italian Encyclopedist and librarian of Biblioteca Ambrosiana in Milan, discovered the authentic Italian manuscript of Antonio Pigafetta among the scattered holdings of the library. Here it came out that the port of March–April 1521 was not Butuan but Mazaua. Amoretti, who himself had not read any of five eyewitness reports of the incident including two French versions of Pigafetta's account, asserted in a footnote that Mazaua was probably the isle named Limasava in Bellin's map, thus interchanging the real port of Mazaua with the way station Gatighan.

Largely with the appearance of the eyewitness account of Ginés de Mafra, the only seaman in Magellan's fleet to return to Mazaua, whose testimony reveals a concrete, measurable description of Mazaua, the skein starting from the garbled version of Pigafetta by Ramusio to the mishandling by Combés to Bellin and finally to Amoretti has been unraveled: Pigafetta's Gatighan is Bellin's Limasava.

== Published works ==
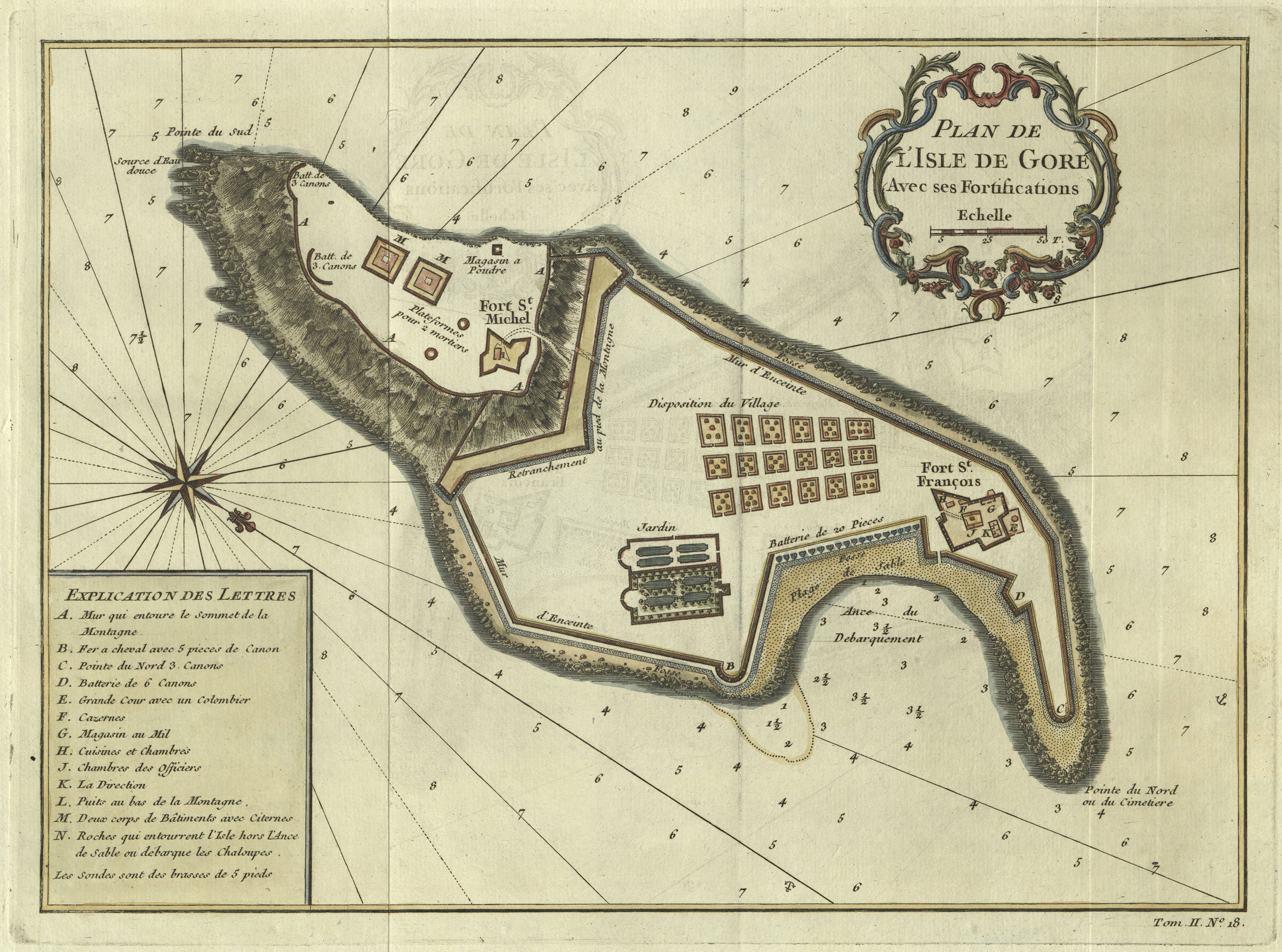
Bellin's Plan de L'Isle de Gore, 1749

Published during his lifetime were:

- Hydrographie française (1753)
- Carte de l'Amérique septentrionale (Map of Northern America) (1755)
- Le petit Atlas François. Recueil de Cartes et Plans des quatre parties du Monde (1758)
- Petit Atlas Maritime (1764)
- Nouvelle méthode pour apprendre la géographie (1769)
- Description géographique du golfe de Venise et de la Morée (1771)

== See also ==
- Sea of the West
