= Cambaro =

Cambaro can refer to the following places in the Philippines:

- Cambaro, Mandaue, a barangay in the city of Mandaue
- Cambaro, a barangay in the municipality of Macrohon, Southern Leyte
