= Gatighan =

The isle of Gatighan was a way station of the Armada de Molucca under Captain-General Ferdinand Magellan on their way to Cebu in Central Philippines. The location of Gatighan has not been conclusively determined.

== Etymology ==
The word Gatighan comes from the Visayan katigan meaning a boat with outrigger or, as verb, to outfit a boat with outrigger.

== Documentation in Armada de Molucca's logbook ==
The logbook states that the fleet left the west port of Mazaua early morning of Thursday, April 4, 1521. According to Pigafetta, they took a northwest track, however Albo claims they took at northern track. The ships sailed 80 nautical miles (150 km) to reach Gatighan at 10° N in 11–13 hours.

During the brief stop on the island, Pigafetta documented the island's fauna: "In this island of Gatighan are a kind of birds called Barbastigly (flying fox), who are as large as eagles. Of which we killed a single one, because it was late, which we ate, and it had the taste of a fowl. There are also in that island pigeons, doves, turtledoves, parrots, and certain black birds as large as a fowl, with a long tail. They lay eggs as large as those of a goose, which they bury a good cubit deep under the sand in the sun, and so they are hatched by the great heat made by the warm sand. And when those birds are hatched they emerge. And those eggs are good to eat."

On Pigafetta's map, Gatighan is the only island mass that straddles between two huge islands, Bohol and Ceylon/Seilani (Panaon Island, the south most end of Leyte). It is almost exactly at the 10° N latitude, reference point of Albo for Gatighan.

== Attempts to locate the island ==
Despite many attempts to determine which island was referred to as Gatighan, opinions still vary on the issue. Theories include:

- F.H.H. Guillemard stated in 1890 that it is perhaps Jimuquitan or Apit Island". R.A. Skelton, Andrea da Mosto, Jean Denuce, Leonce Peillard and Theodore J. Cachey Jr. (who spelled the name "Himuguetan" support this theory.
- Samuel Eliot Morison states that Gatighan is one of the Camotes Islands. However, these islands are too small to sustain the varied fauna described in the logbook.

== Amoretti switches Gatighan with Mazaua ==
Carlo Amoretti, the Augustinian encyclopedist, was director of the Biblioteca Ambrosiana in Milan. In 1797 he discovered the lost handwritten Ambrosiana manuscript of Pigafetta, one of four remaining manuscripts and the only one in Italian (the rest being French). Amoretti transcribed it and published his edition, complete with notes, in 1800. In one of his notes he said Pigafetta's Mazaua may be Bellin's Limasawa, unaware that Limasawa/Dimasawa was in fact a complete negation of what Amoretti is asserting.

Amoretti states that Limasawa and Mazaua are in the same latitude. It has been since determined that Limasawa is in 9° 56' N, whereas three different latitudes (Pigafetta's 9° 40' N, Albo's 9° 20' N, and the Genoese Pilot's 9° N) have been claimed for the location of Mazaua.

== See also ==
- Antonio de Herrera y Tordesillas
- First mass in the Philippines
- Francisco Combés
- Ginés de Mafra
- Mazaua

== Sources ==
Albo, Francisco. 1522. Log-Book of Francisco Alvo or Alvaro. In: The First Voyage Round the World. Lord Stanley of Alderley (ed. and trans.). Ser. I, Vol. II, London 1874, pp. 211–236.

Brand, Donald D. 1967. "Geographical explorations by the Spaniards." In: The Pacific Basin, A History of Its Geographical Explorations. Herman R. Friis (ed.). New York. pp. 109–144, 362-375.

Colín, Francisco. 1663. Labor evangelica de los obreros de la Compañia de Jesús, fundacióon y progresos de Islas Filipinas. Pablo Pastells (ed.), 3 vols. Barcelona 1900.

Combés, Francisco. 1667. Historia de las islas de Mindanao, Iolo y sus adyacentes. W.E. Retana (ed.) Madrid 1897.

de Jesus, Vicente C. (2002). Mazaua Historiography. Retrieved February 27, 2007, from MagellansPortMazaua mailing list: --

Denuce, Jean. 1911. La Question des Moluques et la Premiìre Circumnavigation du Globe. Brussels.

Genoese Pilot. 1519. Navegaçam e vyagem que fez Fernando de Magalhães de Seuilha pera Maluco no anno de 1519 annos. In: Collecção de noticias para a historia e geografia das nações ultramarinas, que vivem nos dominios Portuguezes, ou lhes sao visinhas. Lisboa 1826. pp. 151–176.

Guillemard, Francis Henry Hill. 1890. The Life of Ferdinand Magellan and the First Circumnavigation of the Globe: 1480-1521. New York.

Herrera, Antonio de. 1601. Historia general de los hechos de los Castellanos en las islas y tierrafirme del mar oceano, t. VI. Angel Gonzalez Palencia (ed.). Madrid 1947.

Morison, Samuel Eliot. 1974. The European Discovery of America: The Southern Voyages 1492-1616. New York.

Murillo, Pedro Velarde. 1752. Geografia historica de las islas Philippinas...t. VIII. Madrid.

Pigafetta, Antonio. 1524. Various editions and translations:

--1524a. Magellan's Voyage, Vol. II. R.A. Skelton (ed. and trans.) Nancy-Libri-Phillipps-Beinecke-Yale codex. New Haven 1969.

--1524b. Primo viaggio intorno al globo terracqueo, ossia ragguaglio della navigazione...fatta dal cavaliere Antonio Pigafetta...ora publicato per la prima volta, tratto da un codice MS. Della biblioteca Ambrosiana di Milano e corredato di note da Carlo Amoretti. Milan 1800.

--1524c. Il primo viaggio intorno al globo di Antonio Pigafetta. In: Raccolta di Documenti e Studi Publicati dalla. Commissione Colombiana. Andrea da Mosto (ed. and tr.). Rome 1894.

--1524d. Le premier tour du monde de Magellan. Léonce Peillard (ed. and transcription) Manuscript 5,650. France 1991.

--1524e. Magellan's Voyage, 3 vols. James Alexander Robertson (ed. and tr.) Ambrosiana Codex. Cleveland 1906.

--1524f. The First Voyage Round the World by Magellan. Lord Stanley of Alderley (ed. & tr.) Manuscript 5,650 collated with Ambrosiana and Nancy-Yale codices. London 1874.

--1524g. The First Voyage Around the World (1519-1522). Theodore J. Cachey Jr. (ed. Based on English text of J.A. Robertson) New York 1995.

--1524h. Pigafetta: Relation du premier voyage autour du monde...Edition du texte français d'après les manuscripts de Paris et de Cheltenham. Jean Denucé (ed. and transcription of Manuscript 5,650 collated with Mss. Ambrosiana, Nancy-Yale and 24,224) Anvers 1923.

--1524i. The First Voyage Round the World by Magellan. Lord Stanley of Alderley (ed. and tr. of Ms. fr. 5,650 collated with Ambrosiana Ms). London 1874, pp. 35–163.

Ramusio, Gian Battista. 1550. La Detta navigatione per messer Antonio Pigafetta Vecentino. In: Delle navigationi e viaggi... Venice: pp. 380–98.
