= Cosmographia et geographia de Affrica =

Work by Leo Africanus

Cosmographia et geographia de Affrica ("Cosmography and geography of Africa") is a work completed by Leo Africanus March 10, 1526. At the time of publication, it was the first book by a modern African to reach print. The text from this work was taken by Giovambattista Ramusio and published in the Descrittione dell’Africa in Venice in 1550. The text was translated into French by Jean Temporal in 1556, into Latin by Jan Blommaerts or Joannes Florianus in the same year, and into English by John Pory in 1600.

The original 928 page manuscript exists in its entirety and is held at the National Central Library of Rome, MS V.E. 953. Gabriele Amadori published a first critical edition of this text in 2014.

== Content ==
In the text, Leo Africanus divided Africa into four parts: Barbary, Numidia, Libya, and the Black Lands, areas covering Mediterranean Africa from Morocco to Egypt and spanning to the territories immediately South of the Sahara, from the Atlantic Ocean to Ethiopia.

=== Barbary ===
Leo Africanus split Barbary into four kingdoms: The Kingdom of Marrakesh, Kingdom of Fez, Kingdom of Tlemcen, and the Kingdom of Tunis. Each kingdom of Barbary was further divided into regions. Marrakesh is divided into the regions of Haha, Sous, Guzula, Marrakesh, Doukkala, Haskoura and tadla. Fez is divided into the regions of Tamasna, Fez, Azgar, al-Habat, er Rif, Garet, and Al Haouz.Tlemcen is divided into the regions of the mountains, Tenes and Algers. Tunis is divided into the regions of Bejaia, Constantine, Tripoli and Zeb.

=== Libya ===
Libya was divided into five deserts, taking the names of the people which inhabit them. The five deserts are the lands of the Zananga, the Wanziga, the Terga, the Lamta, and the Bardoa.
