= Delle navigationi et viaggi =

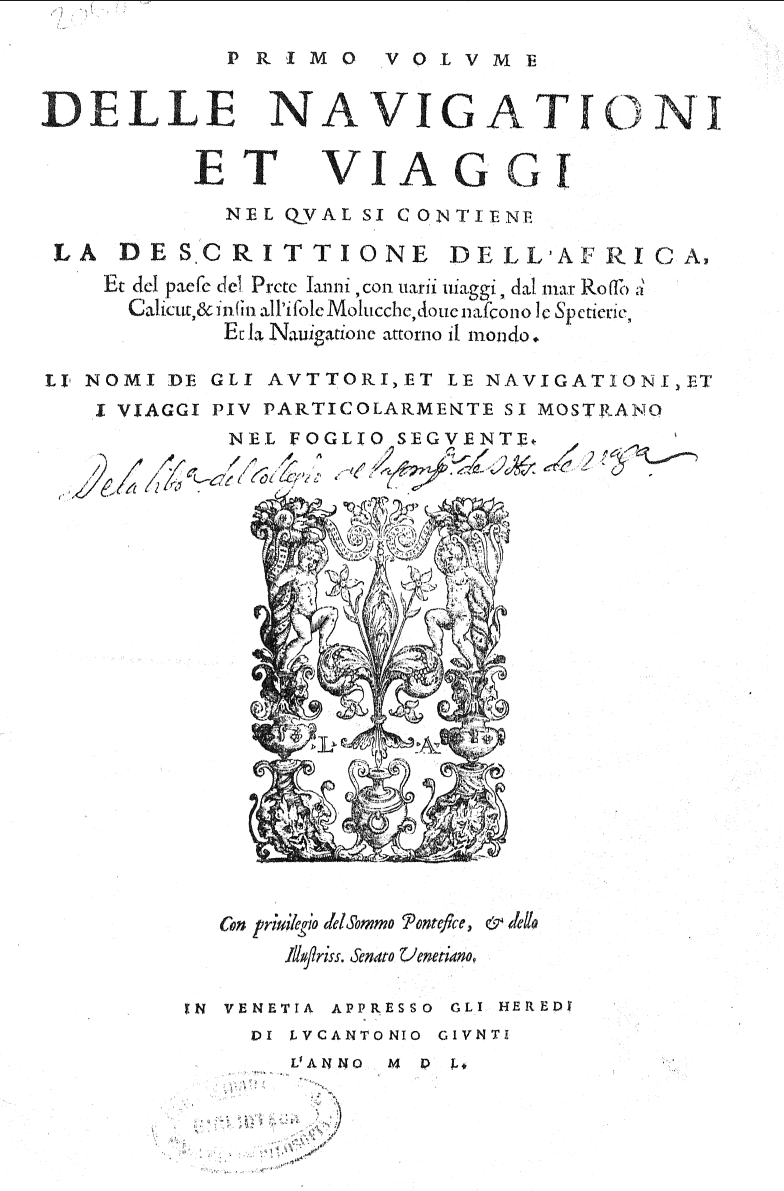
Cover page of the first volume of the Delle Navigationi et Viaggi, by Ramusio (1550)

Delle navigationi et viaggi ("Navigations and Travels") is a compilation of travels first published in 1550-1559, by Giovanni Battista Ramusio, a secretary to the Venetian Council of Ten. It is a collection of first-hand accounts of travels by explorers up the 16th century. The work included in total 82 travel accounts, including the accounts of Marco Polo, Niccolò Da Conti, Magellan, Alvar Nuñez Cabeza de Vaca and Giosafat Barbaro, as well as the Descrittione dell’ Africa.

The first volume was published in 1550, quickly followed by the third volume in 1556. Publication of the second volume was delayed because the manuscript had been destroyed in a fire before being sent to the printer, and was finally published in 1559, two years after its compiler's death. Navigationi et Viaggi was translated into several languages and reprinted a number of times, indicating how popular such books were becoming on the Continent. It paved the way for a slew of other such works, including those of Richard Hakluyt, The Principal Navigations, published in 1589/98-1600.

- First Volume (1550) Primo volume delle nauigationi et viaggi.
- Second Volume (1559) Secondo volume delle navigationi et viaggi.
- Third Volume (1556) Terzo volume delle nauigationi et viaggi.
