= Leo Africanus =

Maghrebi author (c. 1494-c. 1554)

al-Hasan ibn Muhammad al-Wazzan al-Fasi
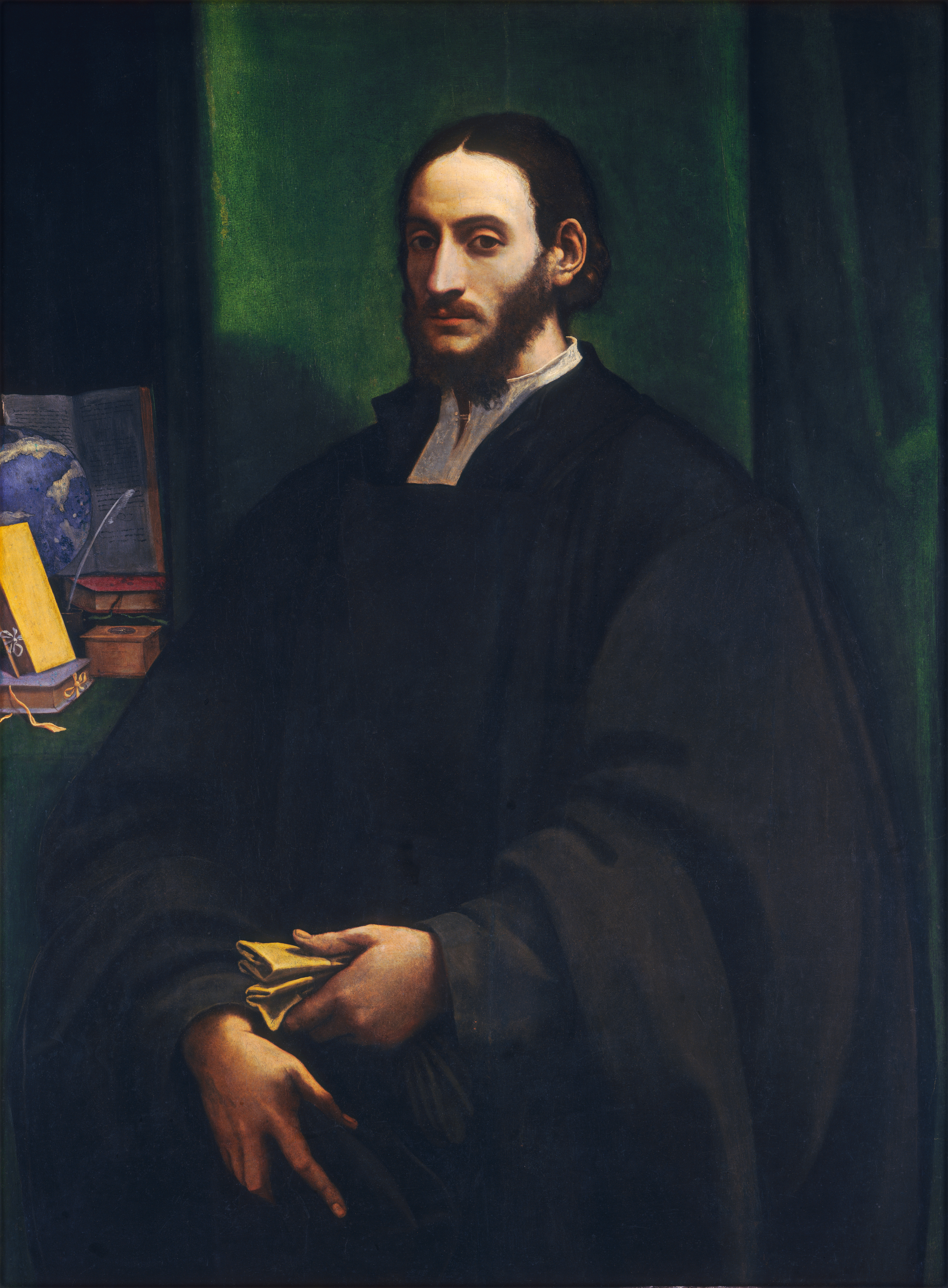
- Portrait of a Humanist, c. 1520. The identity of the sitter is unknown but suggested possibly to be Leo Africanus
- Born: c. 1494; Granada, Kingdom of Castile
- Died: c. 1554 (aged c. 60); Tunis, Hafsid dynasty
- Occupations: Diplomat, geographer, traveler and scientist
- Notable work: Description of Africa

Johannes Leo Africanus (born al-Ḥasan ibn Muḥammad ibn Aḥmad al-Wazzān al-Zayyātī al-Fasī, ; c. 1494 – c. 1554) was an Andalusi diplomat and author who is best known for his 1526 book Cosmographia et geographia de Affrica, later published by Giovanni Battista Ramusio as Descrittione dell'Africa (Description of Africa) in 1550, centered on the geography of the Maghreb and Nile Valley. The book was regarded among his scholarly peers in Europe as the most authoritative treatise on the subject until the modern European exploration of Africa. For this work, Leo became a household name among European geographers. He converted from Islam to Christianity and changed his name to Johannes Leo de Medicis (Arabic: يوحنا الأسد, romanized: Yuḥannā al-Asad). Leo possibly returned to North Africa in 1528.

== Biography ==
Most of what is known about his life is gathered from autobiographical notes in his own work. Leo Africanus was born as al-Hasan, son of Muhammad in Granada around the year 1494. The year of birth can be estimated from his self-reported age at the time of various historical events. His family moved to Fez soon after his birth. In Fez he studied at the University of al-Qarawiyyin (also spelled al-Karaouine). As a young man he accompanied an uncle on a diplomatic mission, reaching as far as the city of Timbuktu (c. 1510), then part of the Songhai Empire. In 1517 when returning from a diplomatic mission to Constantinople on behalf of the Sultan of Fez Muhammad II he found himself in the port of Rosetta during the Ottoman conquest of Egypt. He continued with his journey through Cairo and Aswan and across the Red Sea to Arabia, where he probably performed a pilgrimage to Mecca.

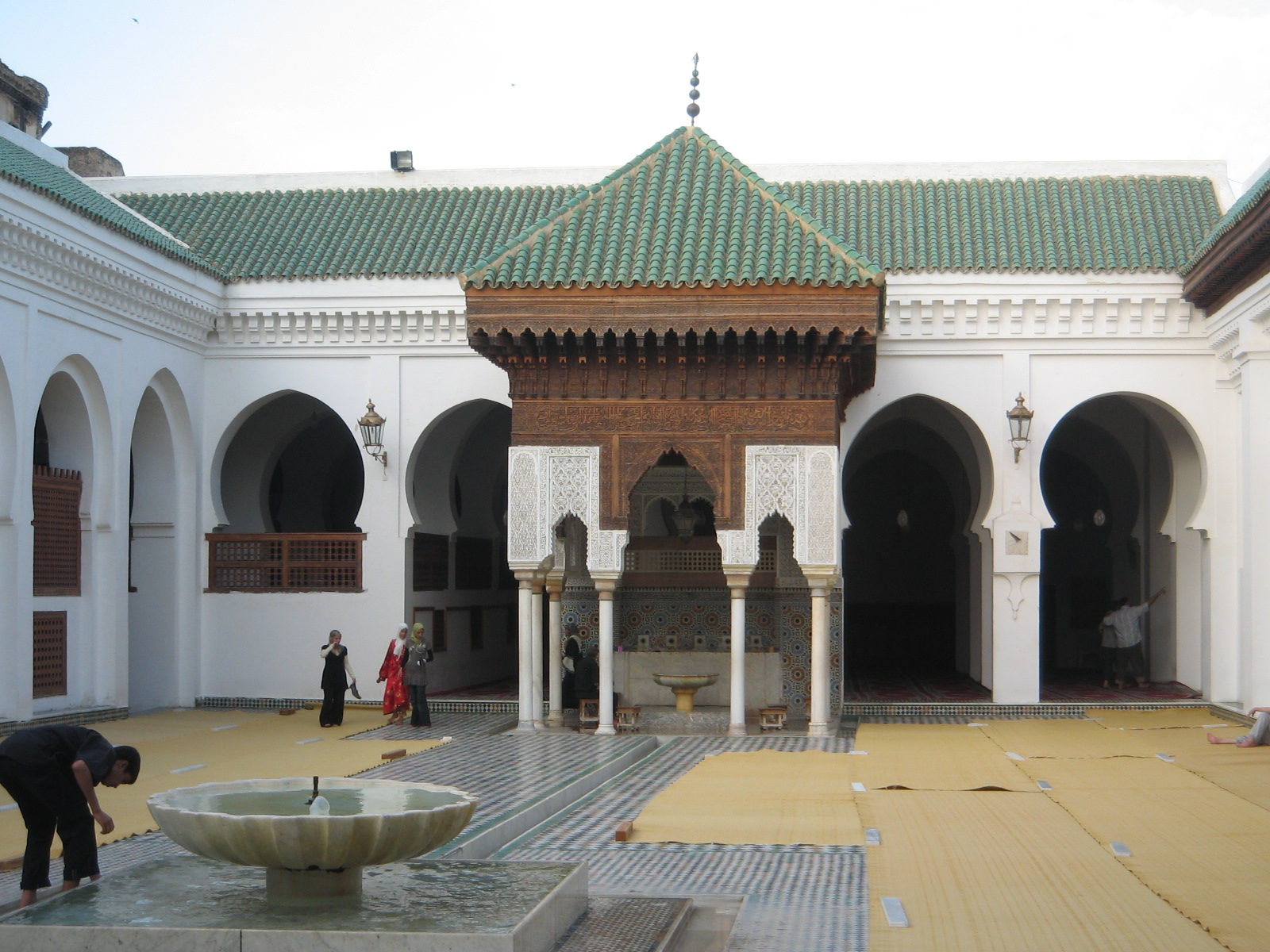
The courtyard of the University of al-Qarawiyyin, Fez, Morocco, where al-Hasan (future Leo Africanus) studied.

On his way back to Tunis in 1518 he was captured by Spanish corsairs either near the island of Djerba or more probably near Crete, and imprisoned on the island of Rhodes, the headquarters of the Knights Hospitaller. The usual fate of unransomed Muslim captives was slavery in Christian galleys, but when his captors realized his intelligence and importance, he was moved to the Castel Sant'Angelo in Rome and presented to Pope Leo X. He was soon freed and given a pension to persuade him to stay. He was baptized in the Basilica of Saint Peter's in 1520. He took the Latin name Johannes Leo de Medicis (Giovanni Leone in Italian). In Arabic, he preferred to translate this name as Yuhanna al-Asad al-Gharnati (literally means John the Lion of Granada). It is likely that Leo Africanus was welcomed to the papal court as the Pope feared that Turkish forces might invade Sicily and southern Italy, and a willing collaborator could provide useful information on North Africa.

Leo Africanus left Rome and spent the next three or four years traveling in Italy. The death of his patron Leo X in 1521, and suspicions from the new Pope Adrian VI against a Muslim in court, was likely the reason for his leaving Rome. While staying in Bologna he wrote an Arabic-Hebrew-Latin medical vocabulary, of which only the Arabic part has survived, and a grammar of Arabic of which only an eight-page fragment has survived. He returned to Rome in 1526 under the protection of the new Pope Clement VII, a cousin of Leo X who replaced Adrian. According to Leo, he completed his manuscript on African geography in the same year. The work was published in Italian with the title Della descrittione dell'Africa et delle cose notabili che ivi sono, per Giovan Lioni Africano in 1550 by the Venetian publisher Giovanni Battista Ramusio. The book proved to be extremely popular and was reprinted five times. It was also translated into other languages. French and Latin editions were published in 1556 while an English version was published in 1600 with the title A Geographical Historie of Africa. The Latin edition, which contained many errors and mistranslations, was used as the source for the English translation.

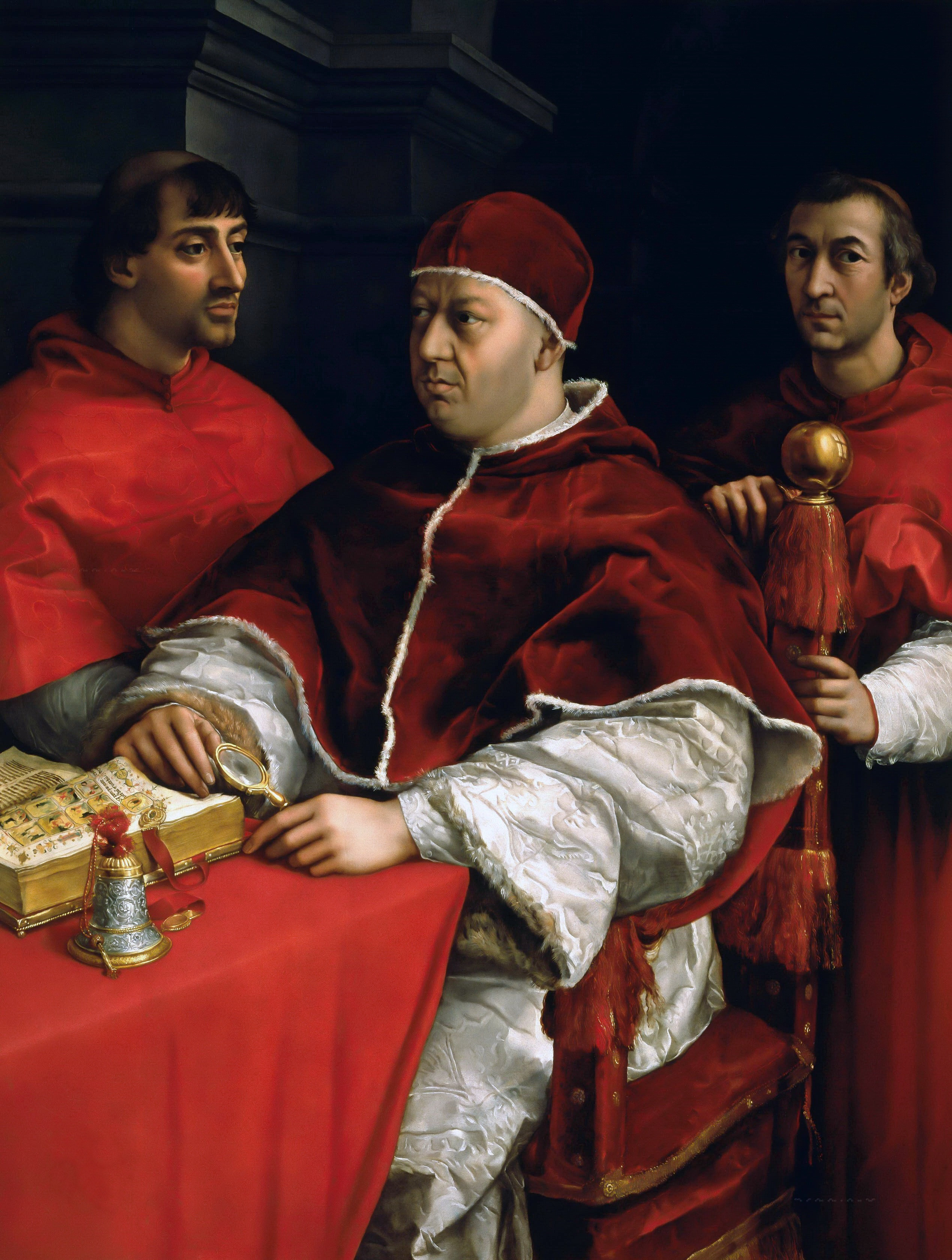
Pope Leo X (center) was Leo's initial benefactor in Rome. His cousin, Giulio de' Medici (left) later became Pope Clement VII and continued the papal patronage of Leo.

There are several theories of his later life, but none of them are certain. According to one theory, he spent it in Rome until he died around 1550, the year Description of Africa was published. This theory was based on indirect allusion in a later preface to this book. According to another theory, he left shortly before the Sack of Rome by Charles V's troops in 1527. He then returned to North Africa and lived in Tunis until his death, some time after 1550. This was based on records by German orientalist Johann Albrecht Widmannstetter, who arrived in Italy and planned (but ultimately failed) to travel to Tunis to meet Leo who had since reconverted to Islam. Yet another theory said that he left Tunis after it was captured by Charles V in 1535 for Morocco, his second home country after Granada where his relatives were still living. This was based on the assumption that Leo, having left Granada, would not have wanted to live under Christian Spanish rule again, and his wish (recorded in Description of Africa) that he wanted to ultimately return to his home country "by God's assistance".

=== Veracity of Africa trip ===
It is possible that Leo Africanus did not visit all the places that he describes and relied instead on information obtained from other travellers. It is doubtful whether he visited Hausaland and Bornu and it is even possible that he never crossed the Sahara but relied on information from other travellers that he met in Morocco. The historian Pekka Masonen has argued that the belief of his further travels was based on misreadings by modern scholars who interpreted his book as an itinerary. At the time Leo visited the city of Timbuktu, it was a thriving Islamic city famous for its learning. Home to many scholars and learned men, Timbuktu also possessed a Great Mosque called the Djinguereber Mosque, renowned for its expansive library. The town was to become a byword in Europe as the most inaccessible of cities. At the time of Leo's journey there, it was the centre of a busy trade carried on by traders in African products, gold, printed cottons, slaves and in Islamic books.

== Name ==
In an autograph in one of his surviving manuscripts, a fragment of an Arabic-Hebrew-Latin medical vocabulary he wrote for the Jewish physician Jacob Mantino, he signed his name in Arabic as Yuḥannā al-Asad al-Gharnāṭī (literally means John the Lion of Granada), a translation of his Christian name, John-Leo, or Johannes Leo (Latin), or Giovanni Leone (Italian). He was also given the family name Medici after his patron, Pope Leo X's family. The same manuscript also contained his original name al-Ḥasan ibn Muḥammad ibn Aḥmad al-Wazzān al-Fāsī. al-Hasan ibn Muhammad was a patronymic name meaning "al-Hasan, son of Muhammad", and al-Fasi is the Arabic demonym for someone from Fez, Morocco.

== Works ==
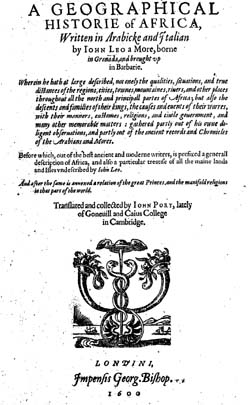
The title page of the 1600 English edition of Leo Africanus's book on Africa.

Cosmographia et geographia de Affrica, later published by Giovanni Battista Ramusio as Description of Africa in 1550, is Leo's most famous work. He wrote an Arabic-Hebrew-Latin medical vocabulary for the Jewish physician Jacob Mantino. He also wrote an Arabic translation of the Epistles of St. Paul, which is dated in January 1521; the manuscript belongs to the Biblioteca Estense in Modena. Another surviving work is a biographical encyclopedia of 25 major Islamic scholars and 5 major Jewish scholars which was completed in Rome before he left the city in 1527 and published for the first time in Latin by Johann Heinrich Hottinger in 1664. Unlike Description of Africa, this biographical work was hardly noticed in Europe; the book contains various erroneous information, likely due to his lack of sources when he was in Italy, forcing him to rely on memory. In Description of Africa, he referred to plans to write other books. He planned two descriptions of places, one for the Middle East and another for Europe. He also planned to write an exposition of the Islamic faith and a history of North Africa. None of these books survived nor has there been any proof that he completed them, which might have been due to his possible return to North Africa.

== References in media ==
A fictionalized account of his life, Leo Africanus, by the Lebanese-French author Amin Maalouf, fills in key gaps in the story and places Leo Africanus in prominent events of his time.

The BBC produced a documentary about his life called "Leo Africanus: A Man Between Worlds" in 2011. It was presented by Badr Sayegh and directed by Jeremy Jeffs. The film followed in Leo's footsteps from Granada, through Fez and Timbuktu, all the way to Rome.

It has been suggested that William Shakespeare may have drawn on Leo Africanus' book when preparing to write Othello.

== Sources ==
- Fisher, Humphrey J. (1978). "Leo Africanus and the Songhay conquest of Hausaland". International Journal of African Historical Studies. 11 (1). Boston University African Studies Center: 86–112. doi:10.2307/217055. JSTOR 217055.
- Leo Africanus (1600). A Geographical Historie of Africa, written in Arabicke and Italian. Before which is prefixed a generall description of Africa, and a particular treatise of all the lands undescribed. Translated and collected by John Pory. London: G. Bishop. The first translation into English.
- Leo Africanus (1896). The History and Description of Africa (3 Vols). Brown, Robert, editor. London: Hakluyt Society. Internet Archive: Volume 1 (pp. 1–224), Volume 2, (pp. 225–668); Volume 3 (pp. 669–1119); Geographical index. The original text of Pory's 1600 English translation together with an introduction and notes by the editor.
- Masonen, Pekka (2001). "Leo Africanus: the man with many names" (PDF). Al-Andalus Magreb. 8–9: 115–143.
- Rauchenberger, Dietrich (1999). Johannes Leo der Afrikaner: seine Beschreibung des Raumes zwischen Nil und Niger nach dem Urtext (in German). Wiesbaden: Harrassowitz. ISBN 3-447-04172-2.
- Whitney, Lois (1922). "Did Shakespeare know Leo Africanus?". Publications of the Modern Language Association of America. 37 (3): 470–483. doi:10.2307/457156. JSTOR 457156. S2CID 163273508.
