= Anne Hart (Canadian author) =

Canadian author (1935–2019)

- Born: Margaret Eleanor Anne Hill; October 7, 1935; Winnipeg, Manitoba, Canada
- Died: October 9, 2019 (aged 84); Victoria, British Columbia, Canada
- Occupations: Library research professor, author
- Children: Susan Hart, Peter Hart, Stephen Hart
- Writing career
- Genre: Biography
- Notable works: The Life and Times of Miss Jane Marple, The Life and Times of Hercule Poirot
- Notable awards: Order of Canada

Margaret Eleanor Anne Hart (née Hill) CM (October 7, 1935 – October 9, 2019) was a Canadian author who specialized in biographies. She was best known for her Agatha Christie character biographies: The Life and Times of Miss Jane Marple and The Life and Times of Hercule Poirot, and for her role as head of the Centre for Newfoundland Studies from 1976 until her retirement on January 1, 1998. In 2004, Hart was made a Member of the Order of Canada for her "lasting contributions to the cultural life of her province."

== Life and work ==
Hart was born in Winnipeg and grew up in Nova Scotia. She received an arts degree from Dalhousie University (where she majored in history) and a library science degree from McGill University.

She later moved to St. John's, Newfoundland and Labrador, where she became a librarian at Memorial University in 1972, working with her mentor Agnes O'Dea. Four years later, she became head of the university's Centre for Newfoundland Studies (CNS). The CNS acquires books, maps, and documents relevant to Newfoundland and Labrador; while Hart was head, the Centre's collection expanded considerably, from roughly 20,000 volumes to 60,000. Also during Hart's tenure, the CNS grew to include an archive, which complemented the centre's book collection. Another notable accomplishment came in 1986, when the CNS was instrumental in the creation of The Bibliography of Newfoundland, a two-volume scholarly work published by the University of Toronto Press in association with Memorial University. Hart retired on January 1, 1998.

== Awards ==
- Member of the Order of Canada. Awarded on October 29, 2004, invested on September 9, 2005, for her contributions to the cultural life of Newfoundland and Labrador. Her citation states: "As Head of the Memorial University Libraries' Centre for Newfoundland Studies, she was instrumental in building a priceless and internationally renowned collection of Newfoundlandiana. These heritage books and documents will provide generations of students, scholars and the public with a record of the history of Newfoundland and Labrador.
- Hart's collaboration with Roberta Buchanan and Bryan Greene on The Woman Who Mapped Labrador: The Life and Expedition Diary of Mina Hubbard was shortlisted for the Winterset Award for excellence in Newfoundland and Labrador writing.
- For her achievements as a biographer and for her contributions to Newfoundland studies, Hart was awarded an honorary doctor of letters degree by Memorial University of Newfoundland.
- Library Trustees' Association Annual Merit Award, for outstanding library trustee, 1986.

== Literary works ==
=== Sole authorship ===
Hart's biographies of Miss Marple and Hercule Poirot were written with the full endorsement of Agatha Christie Limited.

- The Life and Times of Miss Jane Marple (1985, Dodd Mead) - Biography of the Agatha Christie character.
- The Life and Times of Hercule Poirot (1990, Putnam Adult) - Biography of the Agatha Christie character.
- Into Unknown Labrador - an article published in Rediscovering Canada - Image, Place and Text (Nordic Association for Canadian Studies Text Series Vol. 16) edited by Gudrun Bjork Gudsteins. ISBN 9789979544616. Publisher: University of Iceland Press. Publication date: 2001/12/01.

=== Collaborations ===
- The Woman Who Mapped Labrador: The Life and Expedition Diary of Mina Hubbard (2005, McGill-Queen's University Press) - In collaboration with Roberta Buchanan and Bryan Greene - Biography of the first white woman to cross Labrador. The three collaborators edited Hubbard's diary, and Hart wrote the biography of Hubbard.

== Radio ==
CBC Radio Ideas documentary: "Into Unknown Labrador: The Mina Hubbard Story", 1998-05-28. This lecture was also delivered by Hart to The Newfoundland Historical Society on January 27, 2000.
