= Padre Burgos, Southern Leyte =

Municipality in Southern Leyte, Philippines

Padre Burgos Tamulayag
- Municipality
- Municipality of Padre Burgos
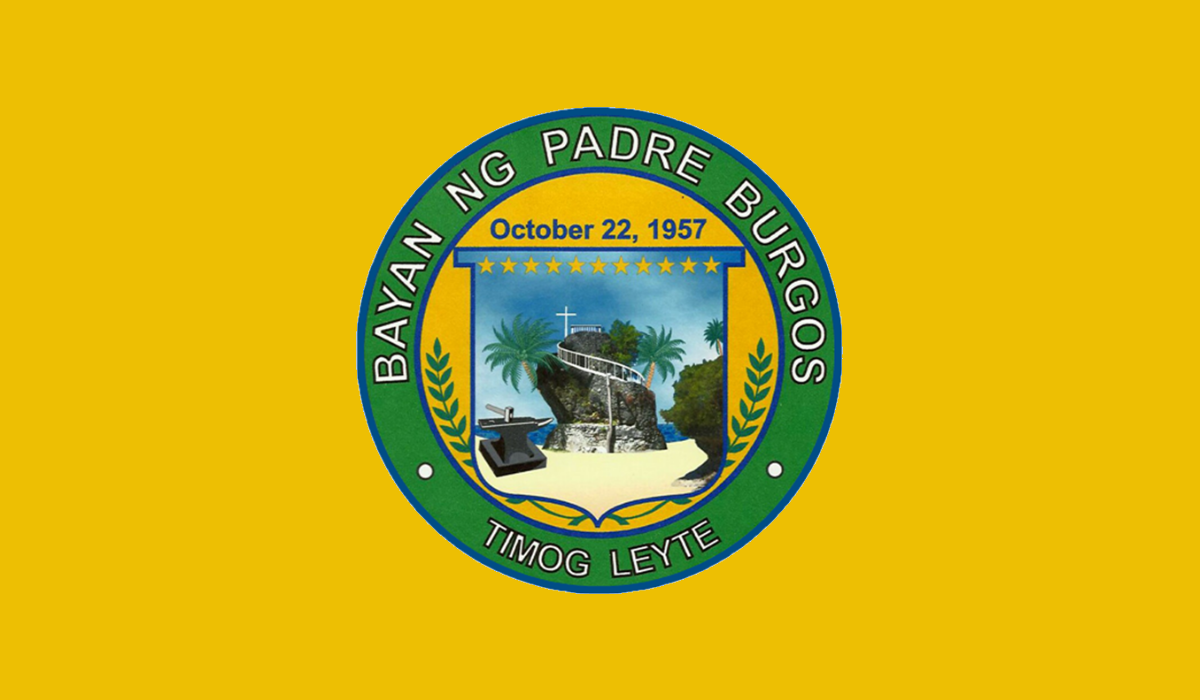
- Flag Seal
- Etymology: Tamulayag
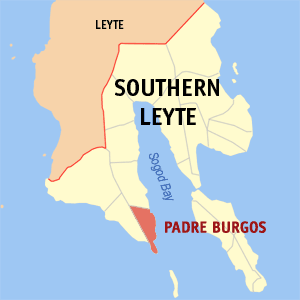
- Map of Southern Leyte with Padre Burgos highlighted
- Interactive map of Padre Burgos
- Location within the Philippines
- Coordinates: 10°02′N 125°01′E
- Country: Philippines
- Region: Eastern Visayas
- Province: Southern Leyte
- District: 1st district
- Founded: 1957
- Named for: José Burgos
- Barangays: 11 (see Barangays)

Government
  - Type: Sangguniang Bayan
  - Mayor: Maria Fe Crispina B. Poblete (PDPLBN)
  - Vice Mayor: Hermenegildo C. Culpa (Lakas)
  - Representative: Luz V. Mercado
  - Municipal Council: Members: Alexander B. Neuda; Edward C. Bactindon; Fritz P. Culpa; Rosario S. Maglinte; Ricardo E. Borces; Brian M. Gilles; Joseph B. Laguna; Joan Aclao-Arias
  - Electorate: 7,831 voters (2025)

Area
  - Total: 25.65 km^{2} (9.90 sq mi)
- Elevation: 32 m (105 ft)
- Highest elevation: 324 m (1,063 ft)
- Lowest elevation: 0 m (0 ft)

Population (2024 census)
  - Total: 11,515
  - Density: 448.9/km^{2} (1,163/sq mi)
  - Households: 2,561

Economy
  - Income class: 5th municipal income class
  - Poverty incidence: 18.49% (2023)
  - Revenue: ₱ 15.12 million (2024)
  - Assets: ₱ 308.1 million (2024)
  - Expenditure: ₱ 88.02 million (2024)
  - Liabilities: ₱ 93.87 million (2024)

Service provider
  - Electricity: Southern Leyte Electric Cooperative (SOLECO)
- Time zone: UTC+8 (PST)
- ZIP code: 6602
- PSGC: 0806410000
- IDD : area code: +63 (0)53
- Native languages: Boholano dialect Cebuano; Tagalog
- Website: www.padreburgosleyte.gov.ph

Padre Burgos, officially the Municipality of Padre Burgos (Cebuano: Lungsod sa Padre Burgos; Tagalog: Bayan ng Padre Burgos), is a municipality in the province of Southern Leyte, Philippines. According to the 2024 census, it has a population of 11,515 people.

The town is famous for its white-sand beaches such as the Tangkaan Beach, from where Limasawa Island can be seen; the Likay-Likay Beach, where one can go fishing and snorkelling; the Bukana which is like a small swam of water and serve as a home of many fishes in Buenavista, the floating Balsa of Bas. Padre Burgos is also famous to diving enthusiasts, the underwater beauty boasts many colourful clusters of corals. With the Local Government's cooperation, Coral Cay, a foreign non-profit organization established its offices in Barangay Tangkaan whose main purpose is to provide help among local people to maintain fish sanctuaries, awareness programs on ocean-life preservation, and clean-up activities on the shorelines of Padre Burgos.

Padre Burgos is also known for its "budbod" (suman), a very sweet sticky-rice.

== Etymology ==
Padre Burgos was named after Fr. José Burgos, one of the martyred priests collectively called Gomburza. It was once called "Tamulayag", a vernacular slang which means "Let's go fishing".

== History ==
Padre Burgos was converted to a municipality from portions of Malitbog and Macrohon through Executive Order No. 265 signed by President Carlos P. Garcia on August 29, 1957.

== Geography ==
Padre Burgos is surrounded by Sogod Bay in the East.

=== Barangays ===
Padre Burgos is politically subdivided into 11 barangays. Each barangay consists of puroks and some have sitios.

- Buenavista
- Bunga
- Cantutang
- Dinahugan
- Laca
- Lungsodaan
- Poblacion
- San Juan
- Santa Sofia
- Santo Rosario
- Tangkaan

=== Climate ===
Climate data for Padre Burgos, Southern Leyte
Month	Jan	Feb	Mar	Apr	May	Jun	Jul	Aug	Sep	Oct	Nov	Dec	Year
Mean daily maximum °C (°F)	28 (82)	28 (82)	29 (84)	31 (88)	31 (88)	31 (88)	30 (86)	30 (86)	30 (86)	29 (84)	29 (84)	28 (82)	30 (85)
Mean daily minimum °C (°F)	23 (73)	23 (73)	23 (73)	24 (75)	24 (75)	25 (77)	24 (75)	24 (75)	24 (75)	24 (75)	24 (75)	23 (73)	24 (75)
Average precipitation mm (inches)	98 (3.9)	82 (3.2)	96 (3.8)	71 (2.8)	104 (4.1)	129 (5.1)	101 (4.0)	94 (3.7)	99 (3.9)	135 (5.3)	174 (6.9)	143 (5.6)	1,326 (52.3)
Average rainy days	18.0	14.1	17.1	16.8	23.7	25.7	25.8	23.3	24.4	25.9	24.0	20.6	259.4
Source: Meteoblue

== Demographics ==
Population census of Padre Burgos
Year	Pop.	±% p.a.
1960	7,125	—
1970	8,045	+1.22%
1975	9,848	+4.14%
1980	10,790	+1.84%
1990	7,375	−3.73%
1995	7,593	+0.55%
2000	8,926	+3.53%
2007	10,194	+1.85%
2010	10,525	+1.17%
2015	11,091	+1.00%
2020	11,159	+0.13%
2024	11,515	+0.76%
Source: Philippine Statistics Authority

=== Religion ===
Majority of the population are members of the Philippine Independent Church (IFI), while others belong to Roman Catholic, Hosanna Assembly of God, The Church of Jesus Christ of Latter-Day Saints (Mormons), Iglesia ni Cristo, and UCCP, among others.

List of Churches

- Roman Catholic Church, Poblacion. Holy Mass every day: Monday & Friday – 5:30 pm; Tuesday & Thursday – 5:30 am; Sunday 5:30 am.
- Iglesia Filipina Independiente (IFI), Barangay Santa Sofia
- Hosanna Chapel Philippines (AG), Barangay Poblacion
- United Church of Christ in the Philippines (UCCP), Barangay Poblacion
- Philippine Independent Church, Barangay Poblacion
- The Church of Jesus Christ of Latter-Day Saints (Mormons), Barangay Cantutang
- Iglesia ni Cristo, Barangay Cantutang

== Economy ==
Poverty incidence of Padre Burgos (%)

Source: Philippine Statistics Authority

Fishing is the main livelihood in the town.

== Tourism ==
- Peter's Dive Resort
- Tangkaan Beach
- Michael's Resort and Dive
- Sogod Bay Scuba Resort
- Padre Burgos Castle Resort
