= Centre for Newfoundland Studies =

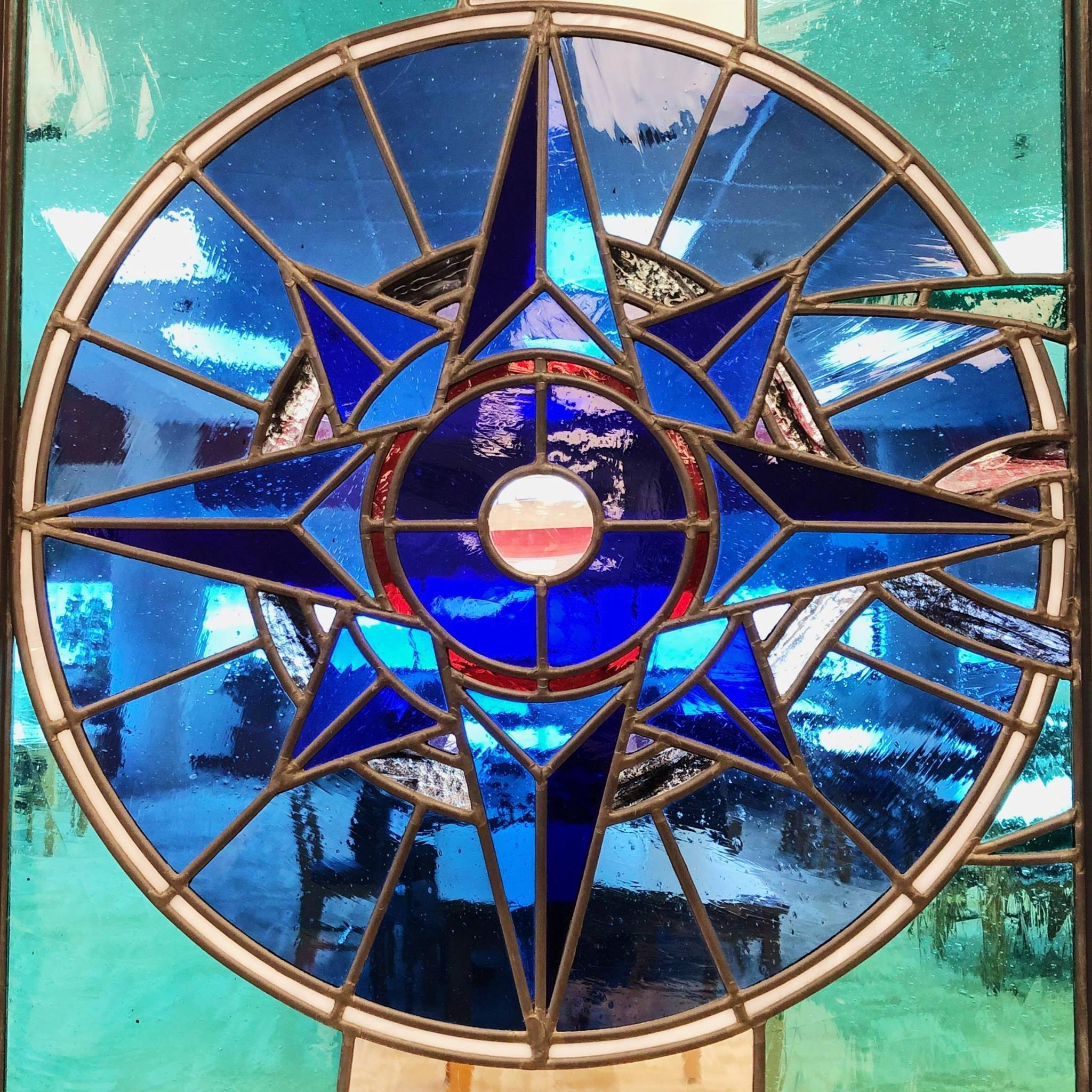
- Stain glass window located within CNS which is a pseudo-logo for the organization
- Nickname: CNS
- Formation: 1965
- Founder: Agnes O'Dea
- Founded at: St. John's, Newfoundland and Labrador
- Purpose: Archival, Cultural and Historical Research
- Headquarters: Queen Elizabeth II Library
- Coordinates: 47.5717°N 52.7343°W
- Key people: Department Head, Colleen Field (2018-)
- Website: https://www.library.mun.ca/cns/

The Centre for Newfoundland Studies is a division of the Memorial University of Newfoundland Libraries, which is completely devoted to the collection and storage of Newfoundland and Labrador related books, documents, articles and maps.

Founded in 1965 by Agnes O'Dea (the first professional librarian in Newfoundland), it is now home to many rare published sources related to the people and history of Newfoundland and Labrador, as well as all material on the province - theses, novels, government publications, pamphlets. In fact, the CNS houses the largest collection of Newfoundland and Labrador material found anywhere. It holds in excess of 93,000 volumes, and more than 34,000 biographical files, subject files of newspaper clippings and files on every community in the province. The CNS answers questions and offers research advice.

== Notable rare items ==
- William Cormack's 1822 map of the interior of Newfoundland with his hand written notes and route.
- Ramusio map of 1556, a navigation chart created in Venice for explorers sailing along the Newfoundland coast.
- A 27-page poem by George Cartwright written in 1792 entitled Labrador: A Political Epistle. One of the first pieces of poetry known to be written about Labrador.
- Robert Hayman's Quodlibets, a call for Englishmen and women to colonize Newfoundland. Composed at Bristol's Hope in the 1620s, it is considered the first work of literature written in the New World.
- Book by William Vaughan entitled The Golden Fleece written in 1626 in which he talks about his attempt to colonize the Southern Avalon from Calvert to Placentia Bay and Trepassey. The book also contains the 1617 map by John Mason.
- Hoppin's diary kept while with the Peary Arctic expedition of 1896.
- Waldseemüller's Tabula Terra Nova, the first separate printed map]of the Americas and thus the first to use the term 'America'.
- Jukes' Excursions in and about Newfoundland during the years 1839 and 1840
