= Macrohon Institute =

Private school in Southern Leyte, Philippines

Coordinates: 10.0770°N 124.9420°E

Macrohon Institute, Inc.

Location
- Brgy. Sto. Rosario, Macrohon; Macrohon, Southern Leyte; Philippines

Information
- Type: Private school, Non-Sectarian
- Motto: Truth, Unity, Resolution: "Success Through Academic Excellence And Faith In The Almighty GOD"
- Established: 1948
- Principal: Lilian J. Caracut
- Enrollment: approx. 600 (as of AY 2010-2011)
- Language: English, Filipino
- Campus: MACI Campus, Brgy. Sto. Rosario, Macrohon
- Colors: Maroon and Gold
- Nickname: MACI
- Affiliations: Southern Leyte Private Schools Association (SOLPRISA)
- Website: www.macrohoninstitute.com

Macrohon Institute, Inc. (MACI) is a non-sectarian private school located in Macrohon, Southern Leyte, Philippines founded in 1948.

== History ==
=== Establishment and early years (1948–1973) ===
Macrohon Institute was established on April 4, 1948, under the leadership of Mayor Rafael Diola Joven. The school officially opened in July 1948 with an initial enrollment of 325 students.

The school participated in academic, athletic, and cultural competitions, receiving recognition from the Bureau of Education from 1960 to 1962 for high performance in the National Senior High School Proficiency Examination. It also received the Governor Alfredo K. Bantug Military Trophy Award for its performance in military training programs.

In 1973, the school celebrated its 25th anniversary with a series of events and competitions among students.

=== Financial challenges and government support (1988–2001) ===
During the 1980s and 1990s, implementation of the Free Public Education System and improving transportation infrastructure resulted in increasing competition from public schools and a decline in enrollment for the Macrohon Institute.

In 1988, the Fund for Assistance to Private Education (FAPE) program was introduced, providing 1.5 million pesos in annual government aid. This financial assistance helped fund the institution.

In the late 1990s, allegations of mismanagement, nepotism, and lack of financial transparency led to legal disputes within the school's administration. A court order in 2000 resulted in a reorganization of the school’s management.

=== Fire incident and recovery (2001–present) ===
On June 1, 2001, a fire destroyed the school's main building, including its administrative offices, library, faculty room, armory, reception area, and science laboratories. The school reopened with only 38 students but continued operations with the support of its faculty.

The Securities and Exchange Commission (SEC) reissued MACI's registration on September 2, 2002, and in April 2003, the Department of Education and Culture granted the school its official certificate of recognition.

In 2005, MACI regained its FAPE funding amounting to 200,000 pesos, which helped stabilize the school’s finances.

== Campus life ==
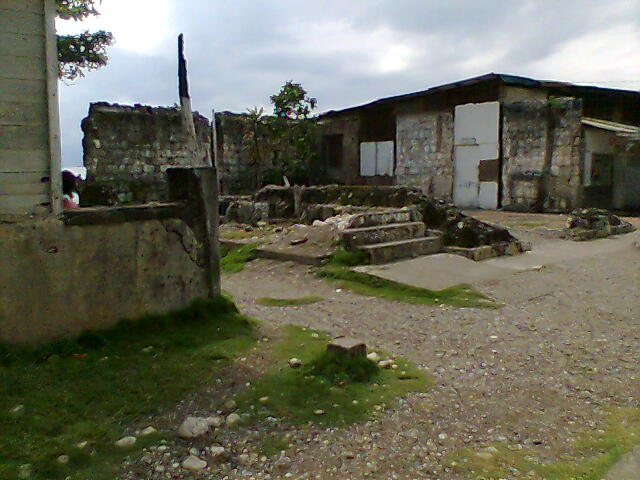
MACI Ground today.

=== Student governance ===
The Macrohon Institute Students’ Supreme Government (MACISGO) has been in place since the school’s founding. Officers are elected annually in June.

=== Annual celebrations and activities ===
- Foundation Day (October 24): Celebrates the birth anniversary of Mayor Rafael Diola Joven, the school’s founder.
- MACI Day (Second week of February): Features academic, cultural, and athletic competitions.

=== Student organizations ===
MACI has two traditional student factions:

1. The Defenders of Our Nation
2. The Rising Youth of Our Country

== Facilities and infrastructure ==
In 2006, the school transferred ownership of its amphitheater complex to the Sobrepeña family, following a lease agreement finalized in 2003. Plans for a four-story school building were proposed.

The school has also constructed a promenade, giving students and visitors to access the nearby beachfront and coral reefs.
