= Ramusio =

Italian noble family

The noble Italian family of Ramusio (also spelled Ramnusio, Rhamnusio, Rannusio) was worth of note for literary and official ability during at least four generations.

Its original home was in Rimini, and the municipality of that city has set up a tablet on the town hall bearing an inscription which may be thus rendered:

The municipality of Rimini here records the claim of their city to the family of the Ramusios, adorned during the 15th and 16th centuries by the illustrious jurist and man of letters Paolo the elder, who rendered the work of Valturius, our fellow-citizen, into the vernacular; by the physician Girolamo, a most successful student of Oriental tongues, and the first to present Europe with a translation of Avicenna; and by Giovanni Battista, cosmographer to the Venetian republic and secretary to the Council of Ten, who bequeathed to the world that famous collection of voyages and travels, regarded in his own day as a marvellous work, and still full of authority among all civilized nations.

The best known of the Ramusio was Giovanni Battista Ramusio, who published Delle navigationi e viaggi, a collection of travellers’ accounts and biographies, including the accounts of Marco Polo, Niccolò Da Conti, Magellan and Giosafat Barbaro, as well as the Descrittione dell’ Africa. He also published an excerpt of Tomé Pires' work on the Indies, which had come into his hands, though he did not know the name of its author.
