= Francisco Combés =

Spanish Jesuit priest

Francisco Combés (5 October 1620 – 29 December 1665) was a Spanish Jesuit priest who established Christian monasteries in the Philippines in the 17th century.

== Life ==
Combés was born in Zaragoza (Spain) in 1620. When he was twelve, he joined the Jesuit order as a novice at Tarragona, harbor city near in Catalonia. Before finishing his priesthood, after only six years of study, he expressed the desire to become part of the expedition to the Philippine Islands. He was assigned to Mexico, and from there he joined a group of Roman Catholic missionaries bound for the East Indies.

In 1643, eleven years after entering the Jesuits, together with forty-six other friars he was sent to the Philippines in an expedition by Diego de Bobadilla. Combés finished his theological studies in the Philippines, and was ordained as a Jesuit in 1645. He was assigned to Zamboanga in Mindanao where he ministered for more than a decade to the religious needs of the natives. In the twelve years that he served there he grew to acquire strategic function, and prestige as a leader, becoming ambassador to the Muslim chieftains, among them Sultan Corralat, and the sultans of Jolo.

He traveled to Manila in 1657, and stayed there for two years. He was assigned to Leyte where he remained for three years. He gained deep insights into the history, the customs and traditions, and the language of the island.

Combés was again recalled to Manila in 1662. Sensing the decline in the Spanish hold on the Muslim areas of Mindanao, he tried to persuade the Spanish government, and religious authorities to strengthen or hold on government fortifications in the island.

While on voyage to Madrid, and then to Rome as procurator of the Jesuit order, Combés died on board on December 29, 1665. He was 45 years old.

Combés wrote a book, Historia de las Islas de Mindanao, Iolo, y sus adyacentes ... (Madrid, Herederos de Pablo de Val, 1667) that contains a three-paragraph section on the voyage of Fernão de Magalhães (i.e. Ferdinand Magellan) in Philippine waters in March–April 1521. It talks of Magellan and his fleet anchoring in Butuan and planting a cross at a mountain there. From Butuan, Magellan and crew sail for Cebu making a brief stopover at an island named "Limasaua". Today, Combés story is seen differently. Instead of anchoring at Butuan, Magellan's fleet is anchored at Limasaua. A mass, which is not mentioned in Combes' story, is held at Limasaua. This phantom mass is celebrated in the Philippines every year and the island Limasaua (now universally spelled with a w in place of u, "Limasawa") is known as the site of the "First mass in the Philippines".

== Bibliography ==
- Albo, Francisco. 1522. Diario ó derrotero del viage de Magallanes desde el cabo de San Agustín en el Brasil, hasta el regreso a España de la nao Victoria. In: Colección de los viages y descubrimientos que hicieron por mar los Españoles des fines de siglo XV, t. IV. Martín Fernández de Navarette (ed.). 1837. Buenos Aires 1945-46. pp. 209–47. Abbreviated CVD in citation.
- 1522b. Log-Book of Francisco Alvo or Alvaro. In: The First Voyage Round The World. Lord Stanley of Alderley (ed. and trans.). Ser. I, Vol. LII, London 1874. pp. 211–236.
- Ayamonte, Martín López de. 1523. A viagem de Fernão de Magalhães por uma Presencial. In: Arquivo Histórico de Portugal, vol. I, fasc. 5, 6. Lisbon.
- Barros, João. 1552-1563. Decadas da Asia. Lisbon, 4 vols.
- Bergreen, Laurence. 2003. Over The Edge of The World: Magellan’s Terrifying Circumnavigation of the Globe. New York.
- Blair, Emma Helen and Robertson, James Alexander. 1901-1907. The Philippine Islands 1493-1898, 55 vols. Cleveland. Abbreviated BR in citations.
- Brito, Antonio de. 1523. Carta escrita de S. João de Ternate, em 6 de Maio de 1523, a D. Manuel I. In: Alguns documentos do Arquivo Nacional da Torre do Tombo. Lisbon 1892: pp. 464–478. Also in CVD, pp. 305–11.
- Colección de documentos inéditos relativos al descubrimiento conquista y organización de las Antiguas posesiones Españolas de ultramar. t. II. Madrid 1886. Abbreviated CDIU in citation.
- Genoese Pilot. 1519. Navegaçam e vyagem que fez Fernando de Magalhães de Seuilha pera Maluco no anno de 1519 annos. In: Collecção de noticias para a historia e geografia das nações ultramarinas, que vivem nos dominios Portuguezes, ou lhes sao visinhas. Lisboa 1826. pp. 151–176.
- Gomara, Francisco López de, Histoire generale des Indes occidentales et terres neuves qui jusques a present ont este descouvertes Paris: 1587)
- Guillemard, Francis Henry Hill. 1890. The Life of Ferdinand Magellan and the First Circumnavigation of the Globe: 1480-1521. New York.
- Herrera, Antonio de. 1601. Historia general de los hechos de los Castellanos en las islas y tierrafirme del mar oceano, t. VI. Angel Gonzalez Palencia (ed.). Madrid 1947.
- De Jesús, Vicente Calibo. 2004. Mazaua, Magellan's Lost Harbor
- Joyner, Tim. 1992. Magellan. Camden, ME.
- Lach, Donald F. 1965. Asia in the making of Europe. 3 vols. Chicago.
- Lagôa, Visconde de. 1938. Fernão de Magalhãis (A Sua Vida e a Sua Viagem). Lisboa.
- Mafra, Ginés de. 1543. Libro que trata del descubrimiento y principio del Estrecho que se llama de Magallanes. Antonio Blazquez y Delgado Aguilera (eds.) Madrid 1920. pp. 179–212.
- Martire, Pietro d'Anghiera (Peter Martyr), 1530. De Orbe Ambito, Chapter 7. In: De Orbe Novo. Alcala.
- Maximilian Transylvanus. 1523. De Moluccis insulis. In: The First Voyage ... Filipiniana Book Guild. Manila 1969: pp. 103–130.
- Medina, José Toribio. 1890. El descubrimiento de Océano Pacifico: Vasco Nuñez Balboa, Hernando de Magallanes y sus compañeros. Chile, 1920.
- Morison, Samuel Eliot. 1974. The European Discovery of America: The Southern Voyages 1492-1616. New York.
- Parr, Charles McKew. 1953. So Noble a Captain: The Life and Times of Ferdinand Magellan. New York.
- Pigafetta, Antonio. 1524. Various editions and translations:
  - 1524a. Magellan’s Voyage, Vol. II. Facsimile edition of Nancy-Libri-Phillipps-Beinecke-Yale codex. New Haven 1969.
  - 1524b. Primo viaggio intorno al globo terracqueo, ossia ragguaglio della navigazione...fatta dal cavaliere Antonio Pigafetta...ora publicato per la prima volta, tratto da un codice MS. Della biblioteca Ambrosiana di Milano e corredato di note da Carlo Amoretti. Milan 1800.
  - 1524c. Il primo viaggio intorno al globo di Antonio Pigafetta. In: Raccolta di Documenti e Studi Publicati dalla. Commissione Colombiana. Andrea da Mosto (ed. and tr.). Rome 1894.
  - 1524d. Le premier tour du monde de Magellan. Léonce Peillard (ed. and transcription of Ms. fr. 5650). France 1991.
  - 1524e. Magellan’s Voyage, 3 vols. James Alexander Robertson (ed. and tr. of Ambrosian). Cleveland 1906.
  - 1524f. Magellan’s Voyage: A Narrative Account of the First Circumnavigation. R.A. Skelton (ed. and tr. of Yale ms.). New Haven 1969.
  - 1524g. * of Ms. fr. 5650 and Ambrosian ms.). London 1874.
  - 1523h. The Voyage of Magellan: The Journal of Antonio Pigafetta. Paula Spurlin Paige (tr. of Colínes edition). New Jersey 1969.
  - 1524i. Il Primo Viaggio Intorno Al Mondo Con Il Trattato della Sfera. Facsimile edition of Ambrosian ms. Vicenza 1994.
  - 1524j. The First Voyage Around the World (1519-1522). Theodore J. Cachey Jr. (ed. based on Robertson’s tr.) New York 1995.
  - 1524k. Pigafetta: Relation du premier voyage autour du monde...Edition du texte français d’après les manuscripts de Paris et de Cheltenham. Jean Denucé (text transcribed from Ms. 5650, collating Mss. Ambrosiana, Nancy-Yale and 24224 in notes.) Antwerp 1923.
- Quirino, Carlos. 1910-1999. "The First Man Around the World Was a Filipino." In: Philippines Free Press, December 28, 1991. --"Pigafetta: The First Italian in the Philippines." In: Italians in the Philippines, Manila: 1980. -- "Enrique." In: Who's Who in the Philippines. Manila: pp. 80–81.
- Ramusio, Gian Battista. 1550. La Detta navigatione per messer Antonio Pigafetta Vicentino. In: Delle navigationi e viaggi…Venice: pp. 380–98.
- The Anonymous Portuguese, 1522. Narratione di un Portoghese Compagno di Odoardo Barbosa, qual fu supra la nave Vittoria del Anno MDXIX. In: Delle Navigatione et viaggi... Venice, 1554. Also, in: 1522. The Narrative of the Anonymous Portuguese. In: The First Voyage Round the World by Magellan. Lord Stanley of Alderley (ed. & tr.). London 1874.
- U.S. Coast and Geodetic. 1927. The United States Coast Pilot, Philippine Islands, Part I.
