= Dimasaua =

Dimasaua, also spelled Dimasawa and Dimasava, was the invented name created by 17th-century Spanish Jesuit priest Francisco Colín for a tiny isle in southern Leyte whose chief, according to Colín, "gave the most signal service" to Ferdinand Magellan and his crew at the port of Butuan in March–April 1521.

The incident is described in a three-paragraph epitome of Magellan's sojourn in Philippine waters, part of a historical study entitled Labor evangelica obreros de la compañia de Jesus en las islas Filipinas, which was published 1663 in Madrid.

Colín identified his principal source for his reconstruction of the above episode as Antonio Pigafetta as edited by Giovanni Battista Ramusio.
