= Description of Africa (1550 book) =

1550 geographical work by Leo Africanus

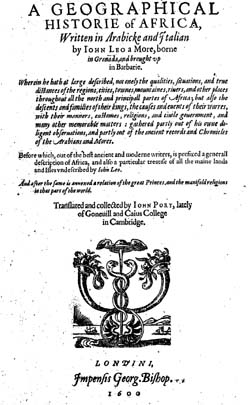
The title page of the 1600 English edition.

Description of Africa was taken largely from the firsthand geographical work Cosmographia et geographia de Affrica completed by Leo Africanus in 1526 and published under the title Della descrittione dell’Africa et delle cose notabili che ivi sono by Giovanni Battista Ramusio in his collection of travellers' accounts Delle navigationi e viaggi in Venice in 1550. It contained the first detailed descriptions published in Europe of the Barbary Coast (modern Morocco, Algeria, and Tunisia) and the gold-trading kingdoms of west-central Africa. The book was dictated in Italian by Leo Africanus, the famed Moorish traveler and merchant who had been captured by pirates and sold as a slave. Presented, along with his book, to Pope Leo X, he was baptized and freed. Leo, whose name he took in baptism, suggested that he recast his Arabic work in Italian; it was completed in 1526. It was republished repeatedly by Ramusio in his Delle navigationi e viaggi, translated into French and into Latin for the erudite, both in 1556.

The Descrittione is in nine books, an introductory book and an appendix on rivers and fauna and flora, with seven books between, each describing a kingdom: the kingdoms of Marrakesh, Fez, Tlemcen and Tunis, and the regions of Numidia, the sub-Saharan regions, and Egypt. The work circulated in manuscript form for decades. It was in Ramusio's manuscript that Pietro Bembo read it and was astonished: "I cannot imagine how a man could have so much detailed information about these things", he wrote to a correspondent, 2 April 1545.

The book's importance stemmed from its accuracy at a time when the area was little known to Europeans, and its publication at precisely the moment when Latin Christian power was on a collision course with the Ottoman Empire in the Mediterranean and Eastern Europe, while at the same time Western Africa was becoming more accessible to Europeans.

The book was an enormous success in Europe, and was translated into many other languages, remaining a definitive reference work for decades (and to some degree, centuries) afterwards. In English it was served by John Pory, whose translation appeared in 1600 under the title A Geographical Historie of Africa, Written in Arabicke and Italian by Iohn Leo a More... in which form Shakespeare may have seen it and reworked hints in creating the title character of his Othello (ca. 1603).

A twentieth-century rediscovery of the originally-dictated manuscript revealed that Ramusio, in smoothing the grammar of Leo Africanus's text had coloured many neutral details, to make it more palatable to Christian European audiences; French and English translators added further embellishments. Modern translations which incorporate this manuscript are thus more true to the original.

== Editions ==
- Giovan Lioni Africano (1550). "Della descrittione dell'Africa et delle cose notabili che ivi sono". In Ramusio, Giovanni Baptista (ed.). Delle Navigationi Et Viaggi (in Italian). Vol. 1 (1st ed.). Venice: Stamperia De Giunti.
- Giovan Lioni Africano (1554). "Della descrittione dell'Africa et delle cose notabili che qvivi sono". In Ramusio, Giovanni Baptista (ed.). Delle Navigationi Et Viaggi (in Italian). Vol. 1 (2nd ed.). Venice: Stamperia De Giunti.
- Jean Léon, Africain (1556). Historiale Description de l'Afrique, Tierce Partie du Monde (in French). Translated by Jean Temporal. Antwerp: Printed by Christophle Plantin.
- Leo Africanus (1600). A Geographical Historie of Africa, written in Arabicke and Italian. Before which is prefixed a generall description of Africa, and a particular treatise of all the lands undescribed. Translated and collected by John Pory. London: G. Bishop. The first translation into English.
- Leo Africanus; Pory, John (1896). Brown, Robert (ed.). History and Description of Africa (3 Vols). London: Hakluyt Society. OCLC 2649691. Scans from the Internet Archive: Volume 1 (pages 1-224); Volume 2 (pages 225-698); Volume 3 (pages 699- ); Index.
- Jean-Léon l'Africain; Épaulard, Alexis (1956). Description de l'Afrique: Nouvelle édition traduite de l'italien par Alexis Épaulard et annotée par Alexis Épaulard, Théodore Monod, Henri Lhote et Raymond Mauny (2 Vols). Paris: Maisonneuve. Scholarly translation into French with extensive notes.
