= Limasawa =

Municipality in Southern Leyte, Philippines

Limasawa Mazaua
- Municipality
- Municipality of Limasawa
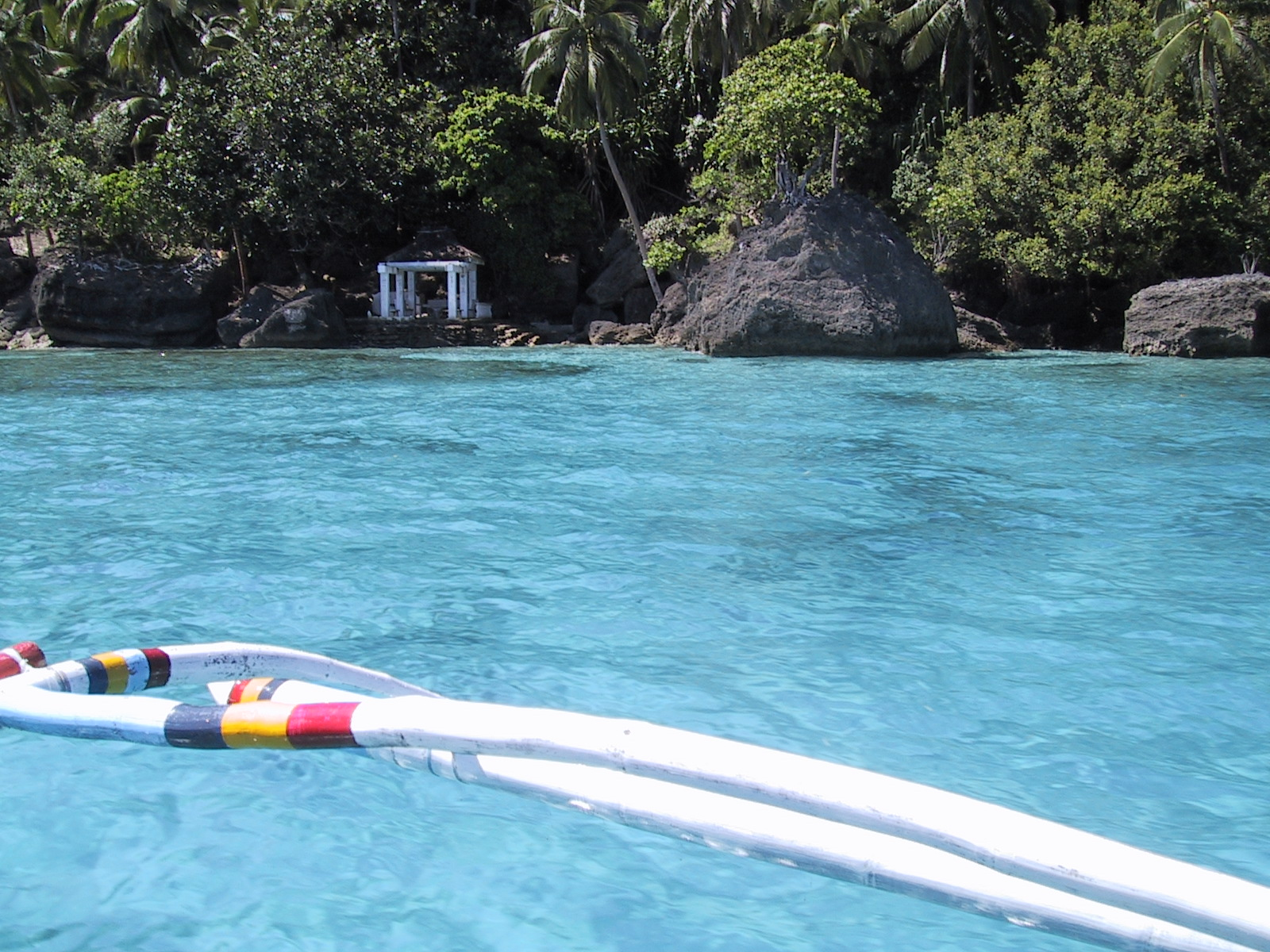
- Sea in the island

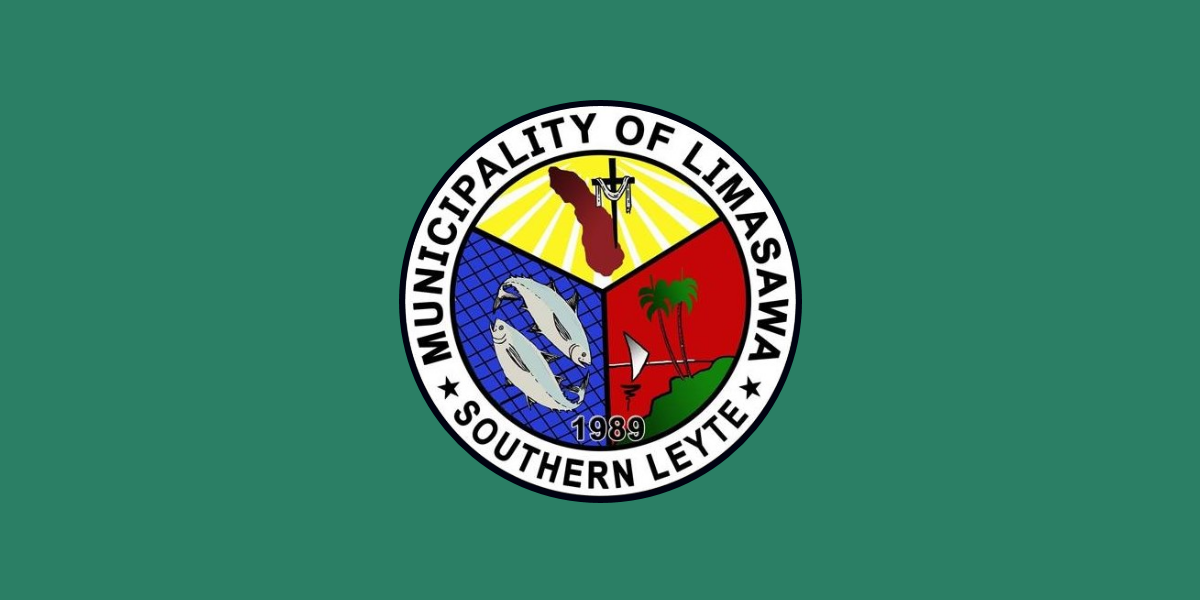
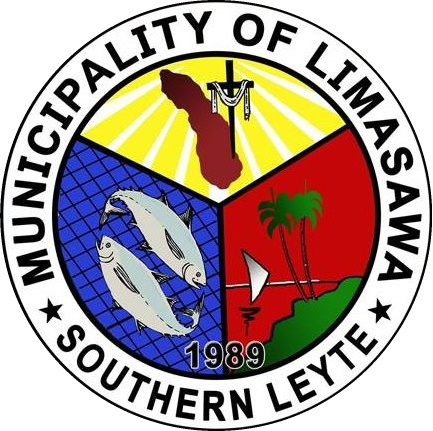
- Flag Seal
- Nickname: "The First Mass Site in the Philippines"
- Motto: Ang hindi marunong magmahal sa sariling wika ay higit pa sa hayop at malansang isda.
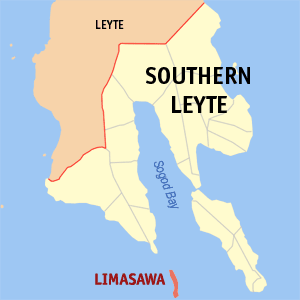
- Map of Southern Leyte with Limasawa highlighted
- Interactive map of Limasawa
- Location within the Philippines Limasawa (Philippines)
- Coordinates: 9°54′28″N 125°04′30″E
- Country: Philippines
- Region: Eastern Visayas
- Province: Southern Leyte
- District: 1st district
- Founded: June 11, 1978 (Completely became official on August 27, 1989)
- Barangays: 6 (see Barangays)

Government
  - Type: Sangguniang Bayan
  - Mayor: Melchor P. Petracorta (Lakas)
  - Vice Mayor: Ritche L. Salomon (Lakas)
  - Representative: Luz V. Mercado
  - Municipal Council: Members: Modesto P. Petracorta; Arben C. Dagohoy; Sim B. Olojan; Ezer B. Angob; Sally M. Oro; Jona O. Lambot; Renato M. Salomon; Alfredo P. Galvez
  - Electorate: 4,436 voters (2025)

Area
  - Total: 6.98 km^{2} (2.69 sq mi)
- Elevation: 13 m (43 ft)
- Highest elevation: 848 m (2,782 ft)
- Lowest elevation: 0 m (0 ft)

Population (2024 census)
  - Total: 7,118
  - Density: 1,020/km^{2} (2,640/sq mi)
  - Households: 1,491
- Demonym: Limasawan

Economy
  - Income class: 5th municipal income class
  - Poverty incidence: 18.42% (2023)
  - Revenue: ₱ 5.024 million (2024)
  - Assets: ₱ 310.1 million (2024)
  - Expenditure: ₱ 98.47 million (2024)
  - Liabilities: ₱ 104.9 million (2024)

Service provider
  - Electricity: Southern Leyte Electric Cooperative (SOLECO)
- Time zone: UTC+8 (PST)
- ZIP code: 6605
- PSGC: 0806419000
- IDD : area code: +63 (0)53
- Native languages: Boholano dialect Cebuano; Tagalog

Limasawa, officially the Municipality of Limasawa (Cebuano: Lungsod sa Limasawa; Filipino: Bayan ng Limasawa), is an island municipality in the province of Southern Leyte, Philippines. According to the 2024 census, it has a population of 6,480 people, making it the least populated town in the province.

== History ==
Limasawa was the second island (after Suluan) of the Philippines that the Magellan Expedition landed on. Antonio Pigafetta documented the island as "Mazaua". He described it as being inhabited with cultivated fields. In March 28, 1521 the Magellan Expedition met with two rulers, Rajah Colambu and Rahah Siaui, of the Rajahnate of Butuan and "Calagan" (Caraga), which Pigafetta misidentified as islands. The rulers were on a hunting expedition on Limasawa (which were under their domain) with two balangay ships. The rulers entertained Magellan's crew with feasting for a few days. Afterwards, Father Pedro de Valderrama performed the first mass in the Philippines on Easter Sunday (March 31, 1521). Magellan also climbed the highest elevation in Limasawa and erected a cross before leaving for "Zubu" (Cebu).

At the request of the residents of the island of Limasawa, the six barangays that comprise that island were detached and separated from the municipality of Padre Burgos through Presidential Decree No. 1549, signed by then President Ferdinand Marcos on June 11, 1978, with the effort of the Late Guillermo trigo Urag, and constituted as the Municipality of Limasawa. Limasawa completely became a municipality on August 27, 1989, after then President Corazon Aquino ordered the plebiscite which its residents voted in favor of the creation. The island, also known as Limasawa Island, is located south of Leyte, in the Mindanao or Bohol Sea. It is about 10 kilometres (6.2 mi) long from north to south and is the smallest municipality in the province, in both area and population.

== Geography ==
=== Barangays ===
Limasawa is politically subdivided into 6 barangays. Each barangay consists of puroks and some have sitios.

- Cabulihan
- Lugsongan
- Magallanes (Poblacion)
- San Agustin (Tawid)
- San Bernardo (Tigib)
- Trianas

=== Climate ===
Climate data for Limasawa, Southern Leyte
Month	Jan	Feb	Mar	Apr	May	Jun	Jul	Aug	Sep	Oct	Nov	Dec	Year
Mean daily maximum °C (°F)	27 (81)	28 (82)	29 (84)	30 (86)	31 (88)	30 (86)	29 (84)	30 (86)	30 (86)	29 (84)	28 (82)	28 (82)	29 (84)
Mean daily minimum °C (°F)	22 (72)	22 (72)	22 (72)	23 (73)	24 (75)	24 (75)	23 (73)	23 (73)	23 (73)	23 (73)	23 (73)	23 (73)	23 (73)
Average precipitation mm (inches)	98 (3.9)	82 (3.2)	96 (3.8)	71 (2.8)	104 (4.1)	129 (5.1)	101 (4.0)	94 (3.7)	99 (3.9)	135 (5.3)	174 (6.9)	143 (5.6)	1,326 (52.3)
Average rainy days	18.0	14.1	17.1	16.8	23.7	25.7	25.8	23.3	24.4	25.9	24.0	20.6	259.4
Source: Meteoblue

== Demographics ==
Population census of Limasawa
Year	Pop.	±% p.a.
1990	4,519	—
1995	4,927	+1.63%
2000	5,157	+0.98%
2007	5,831	+1.71%
2010	5,835	+0.02%
2015	6,061	+0.73%
2020	6,191	+0.45%
2024	6,480	+1.10%
Source: Philippine Statistics Authority

== Economy ==
Poverty incidence of Limasawa (%)

Source: Philippine Statistics Authority

== See also ==
- Butuan
- Dimasaua
- First Mass in the Philippines
- Ruy López de Villalobos
