= Giovanni Battista Ramusio =

Italian geographer and travel writer (1485–1557)

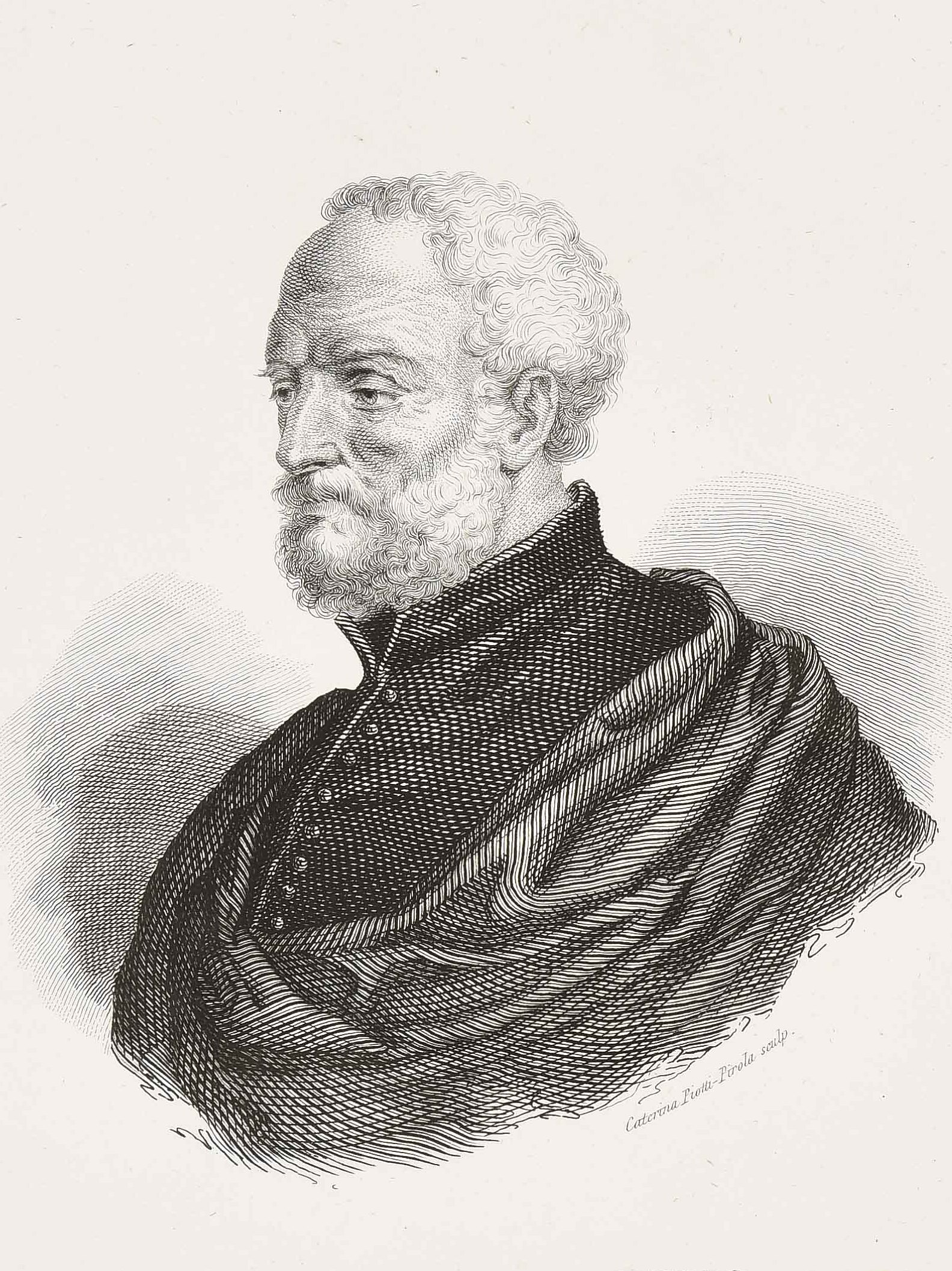
- Calcography by Caterina Piotti Pirola (1837)
- Born: 20 July 1485; Treviso, Republic of Venice
- Died: 10 July 1557 (aged 71); Padua, Republic of Venice
- Occupations: Geographer, travel writer, editor
- Notable work: Delle Navigationi et Viaggi

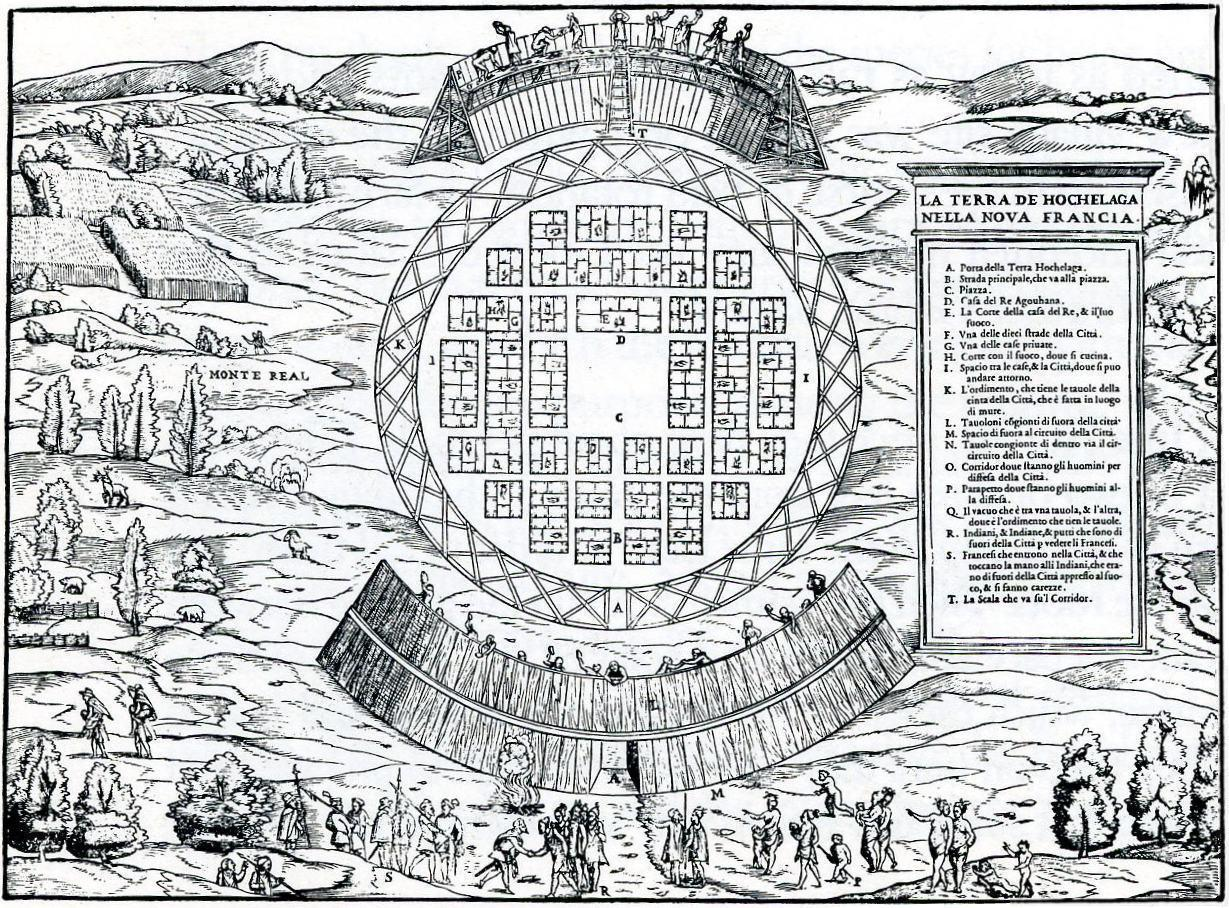
The Land Of Hochelaga In the New France, designed by Giacomo Gastaldi, illustration of the book Delle Navigationi et Viaggi.

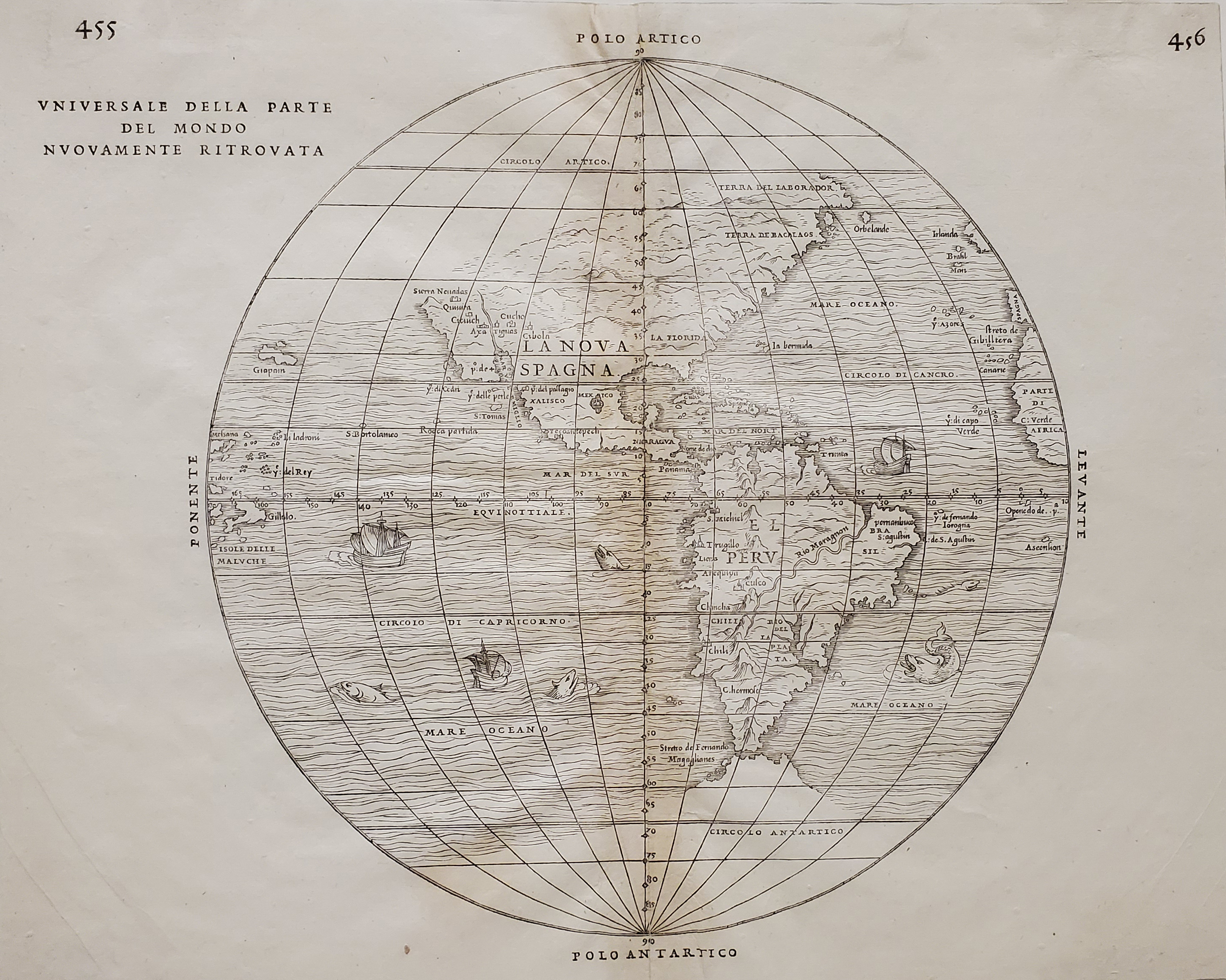
Universale della Parte del Mondo Novamente Ritrovata ("General Map of the Newly Discovered Part of the World"), 1556 map created by Ramusio and Gastaldi

Giovanni Battista Ramusio (Italian pronunciation: [dʒoˈvanni batˈtista raˈmuːzjo]; July 20, 1485 – July 10, 1557) was an Italian geographer and travel writer.

Born in Treviso, Italy, at that time in the Republic of Venice, Ramusio was the son of Paolo Ramusio, a magistrate of the Venetian city-state. In 1505 young Giovanni took a position as secretary to Aloisio Mocenigo, of the patrician Mocenigo family, (Note: Aloisio Mocenigo, also sometimes named as Alvise, and so confused with his later-era kinsmen and doges of Venice: Alvise I Mocenigo, Alvise II Mocenigo and Alvise Giovanni Mocenigo. Aloisio, probably with Ramusio's aid, sourced in France - and brought back to Venice - a hitherto unknown early manuscript of Pliny the Younger's Letters. This version of Pliny was printed in 1508 by the Aldine Press) then serving as the Republic's ambassador to France. Ramusio would spend the rest of his career in Venetian service. He was keenly interested in geography, and his position ensured that he would receive news of all the latest discoveries from explorers around Europe as they were sent back to Venice. A learned man, fluent in several languages, he began to compile these documents and translated them into Italian, then the most widely understood of the European languages. He died in Padua.

== Collection of travel books ==
Though he himself traveled little, Ramusio published Delle navigationi et viaggi ("Navigations and Travels"); a collection of explorers' first-hand accounts of their travels. This was the first work of its kind. It included the accounts of Marco Polo, Niccolò Da Conti, Magellan, Alvar Nuñez Cabeza de Vaca and Giosafat Barbaro, as well as the Descrittione dell’ Africa. The description of China contains the first reference in European literature to tea.

He also published an excerpt of Tomé Pires' work on the Indies, which had come into his hands, though he did not know the name of its author.

The first volume was published in 1550, quickly followed by the third volume in 1556. Publication of the second volume was delayed because the manuscript had been destroyed in a fire before being sent to the printer, and was finally published in 1559, two years after its compiler's death. Navigationi et Viaggi was translated into several languages and reprinted a number of times, indicating how popular such books were becoming on the Continent. It paved the way for a slew of other such works, including those of Richard Hakluyt.

== See also ==
- Ramusio family
