= Santiago (caravel) =

16th-century Spanish caravel

History

Spain
- Fate: Shipwrecked in Patagonia
- Notes: Part of the Magellan expedition

General characteristics
- Type: Caravel
- Tonnage: 90 toneladas
- Propulsion: Sail
- Complement: 31

Santiago was a 16th century Spanish caravel, which was part of the Magellan expedition to the Spice Islands (the Maluku Islands). It was shipwrecked on the coast of Patagonia in the mouth of the Santa Cruz river in 1520.

== History ==
At 75 toneles (90 toneladas), it had the smallest capacity of the five ships commanded by Ferdinand Magellan "for the discovery of the Spice Islands". The ship cost 187,500 maravedíes. It was the only caravel in the fleet.

When the expedition left Seville on August 10, 1519, the Santiago carried a crew of 31 men. Her captain and navigator was Juan Serrano, a sailor of Portuguese origin living in Seville.

After exploring the American coast south of Brazil, searching unsuccessfully for a navigable passage to the South Seas, the squadron arrived on March 31, 1520 at a bay in Patagonia (Santa Cruz Province, Argentina) called "harbor of San Julián", where they prepared to spend the winter. While there several of the expedition's captains, discontented with Magellan's operational approach and doubting that a passage to the South Seas could be found in that region, mutinied and took control of the ships Concepción, San Antonio and Victoria. Magellan regained control of Victoria, killing her captain in a surprise attack, and brought her together with Santiago and Trinidad at the entrance of the bay, blocking the escape of the two rebellious ships, which were forced to surrender.

While the rest of the ships finished their repairs in the harbor of San Julian the Santiago was sent by Magellan to scout the southern coast. She arrived on the May 13 to the bay at the mouth of the Santa Cruz river, where she remained six days fishing and taking on water and firewood. On May 20 the Santiago left Santa Cruz, and the following day the ship was caught up in a storm that worsened throughout the night. On the 22nd the storm drove the ship against the coast, leaving it beached and at the mercy of the storm. The entire crew, except one of Serrano's slaves who drowned, escaped to the shore. Serrano sent two sailors to return overland to San Julian to report the shipwreck while he salvaged what he could of the ship.

The ship Santiago, which had been dispatched to scout the coast, was shipwrecked on the shoals; nonetheless, all of the crew were miraculously saved. Two sailors came by land to the harbor in which we were to make known to us the disaster, and the captain general immediately sent some men with sacks of biscuit. The crew remained at the site of the shipwreck for two months to salvage the remains of the ship and the goods that the sea periodically cast upon the shore, and during this entire time we sent them victuals, although the distance was one hundred miles and the path was difficult and wearisome, full of thorns and undergrowth, among which they had to camp, not having anything to drink besides the ice, which they had to crush, a task which consumed great labor.

— Antonio Pigafetta. es:Relación del primer viaje alrededor del mundo.

Magellen distributed the survivors between the remaining ships and named Juan Serrano captain of the Concepción, the ship previously captained by Gaspar de Quesada, who had been executed for treason on April 7 due to being one of the ringleaders of the mutiny at San Julian harbor.

=== Shipwreck found ===
Argentine diver Daniel E. Guillén allegedly found the Santiago at the mouth of the Santa Cruz River in 1982. He saw some wooden fragments belonging to the nao and returned to the surface with samples. Tests were reportedly performed by researchers at the Centro Nacional de Aceleradores to confirm the date of the wreck using Carbon 14 dating.

== Bibliography ==
- Fernández de Navarrete, Martín (1837). Expediciones al Maluco, viage de Magallanes y de Elcano. Imprenta Nacional.
- Bernal, Cristóbal (17 January 2015). "Relación de varios acaecimientos sucedidos a la armada de Magallanes cuando iba a la Especiería, y vuelta de la nao San António el 8 de mayo de 1521, que surgió en el puerto de las Muelas" (PDF). es:Sevilla 2019-2022.
- Pigafetta, Antonio (1922) [1536]. Primer viaje en torno del globo. Translated by Federico Ruiz Morcuende. Madrid: es:Editorial Calpe.
