= 1522 =

1522 in various calendars
- Gregorian calendar: 1522; MDXXII
- Ab urbe condita: 2275
- Armenian calendar: 971; ԹՎ ՋՀԱ
- Assyrian calendar: 6272
- Balinese saka calendar: 1443–1444
- Bengali calendar: 928–929
- Berber calendar: 2472
- English Regnal year: 13 Hen. 8 – 14 Hen. 8
- Buddhist calendar: 2066
- Burmese calendar: 884
- Byzantine calendar: 7030–7031
- Chinese calendar: 辛巳年 (Metal Snake); 4219 or 4012 — to — 壬午年 (Water Horse); 4220 or 4013
- Coptic calendar: 1238–1239
- Discordian calendar: 2688
- Ethiopian calendar: 1514–1515
- Hebrew calendar: 5282–5283
- Hindu calendars
- Vikram Samvat: 1578–1579
- Shaka Samvat: 1443–1444
- Kali Yuga: 4622–4623
- Holocene calendar: 11522
- Igbo calendar: 522–523
- Iranian calendar: 900–901
- Islamic calendar: 928–929
- Japanese calendar: Daiei 2 (大永２年)
- Javanese calendar: 1439–1440
- Julian calendar: 1522; MDXXII
- Korean calendar: 3855
- Minguo calendar: 390 before ROC 民前390年
- Nanakshahi calendar: 54
- Thai solar calendar: 2064–2065
- Tibetan calendar: ལྕགས་མོ་སྦྲུལ་ལོ་ (female Iron-Snake); 1648 or 1267 or 495 — to — ཆུ་ཕོ་རྟ་ལོ་ (male Water-Horse); 1649 or 1268 or 496

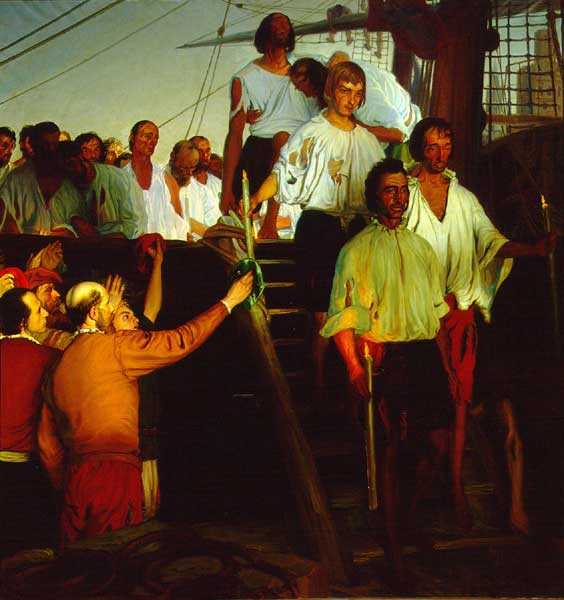
September 6: Eighteen men, including Captain Juan Sebastián Elcano, return to Spain as the first people to travel around the world.

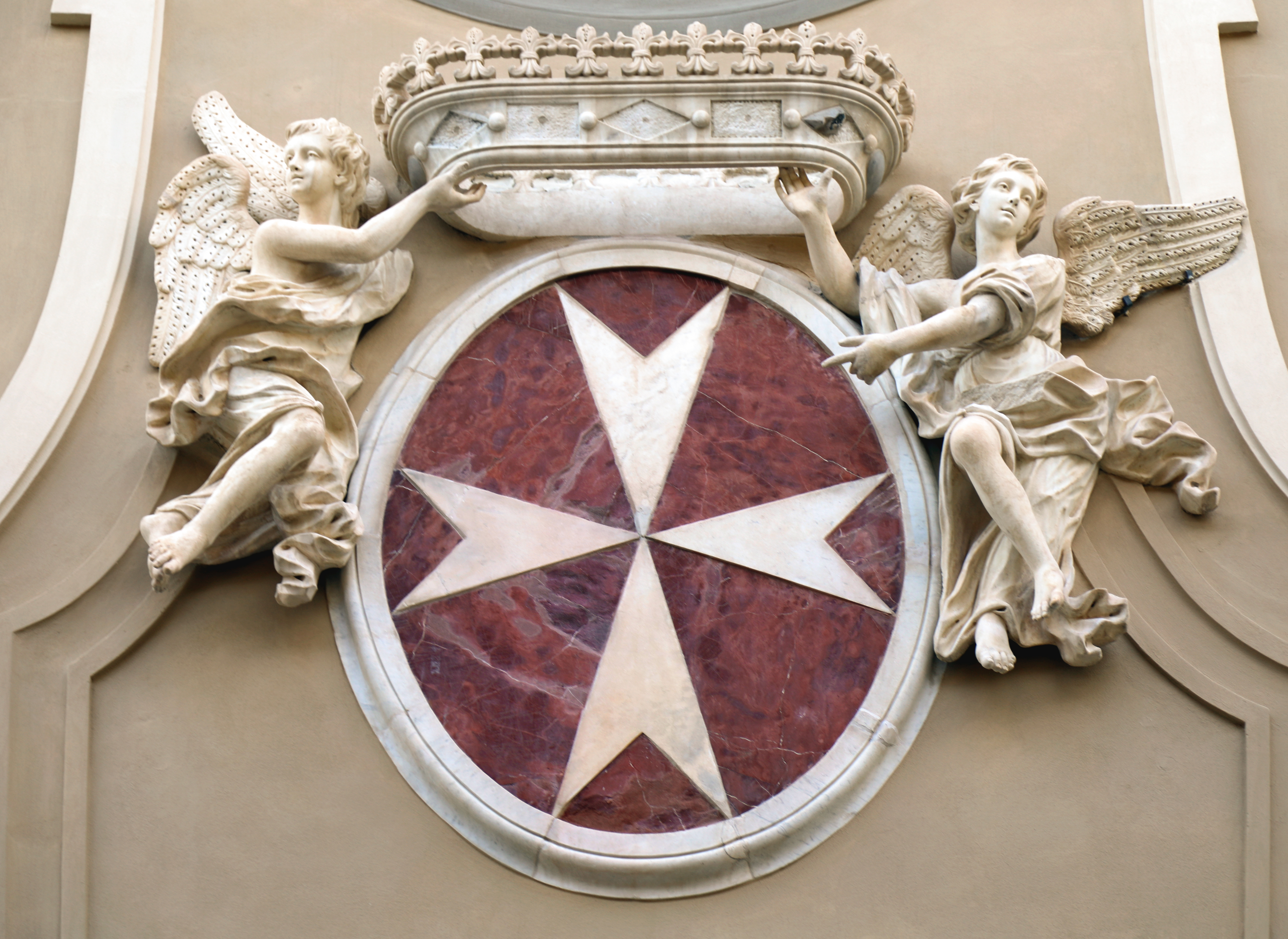
December 20: The Knights of Malta are allowed to leave Rhodes.

Year 1522 (MDXXII) was a common year starting on Wednesday of the Julian calendar, the 1522nd year of the Common Era (CE) and Anno Domini (AD) designations, the 522nd year of the 2nd millennium, the 22nd year of the 16th century, and the 3rd year of the 1520s decade.

== Events ==
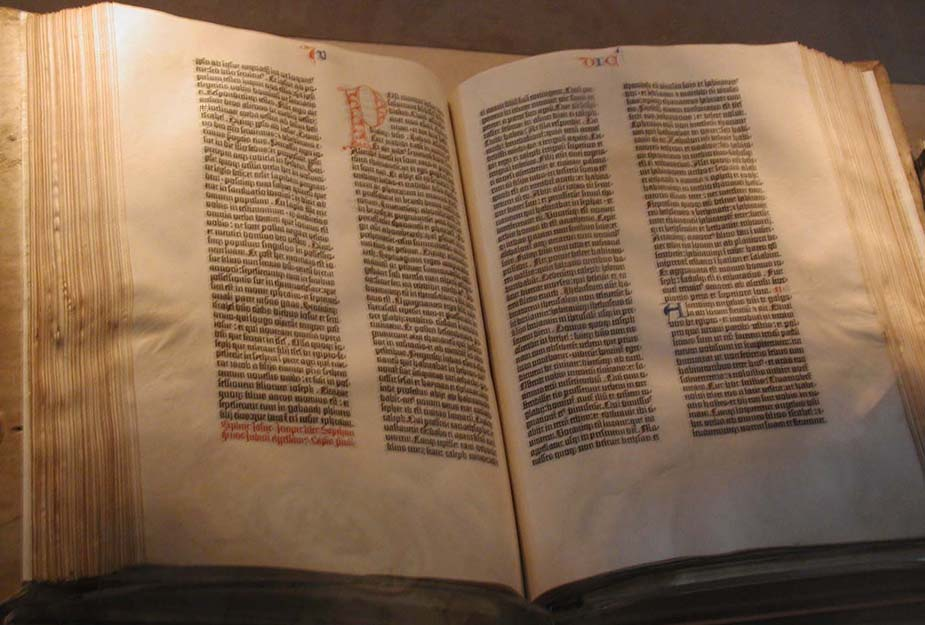
3rd Textus Receptus.

=== January–March ===
- January 9 – The papal conclave to elect a successor to the late Pope Leo X is concluded as cardinal Adriaan Florensz Boeyens of the Netherlands, regent of Spain and bishop of Tortosa, is selected as a compromise candidate despite being absent from the proceedings. Cardinal Boeyens is proclaimed as Pope Adrian VI, the 218th pope and the last non-Italian pontiff for the next 450 years.
- January 26 – Spanish conquistador Gil González Dávila sets out from the gulf of Panama to explore the Pacific coast of Central America. He explores Nicaragua and names Costa Rica when he finds copious quantities of gold in Pacific beaches.
- February 5 – In Castile in Spain, the Revolt of the Comuneros is re-ignited when King Carlos V reneges on a promised amnesty to participants in a 1520 uprising, and threatens to execute revolt leader María Pacheco. Calm is restored by the intervention of Maria de Mendoza, and while many of the rebels are punished, Pacheco is able to escape to Portugal.
- February 7 – The Pact of Brussels is signed between Charles V, Holy Roman Emperor and his younger brother Archduke Ferdinand, guaranteeing Charles's support of Ferdinand to become the King of the Romans.
- February 10 – The Grünwald Conference takes place in the Duchy of Bavaria in Germany, as the co-rulers, Duke Wilhelm IV and Duke Ludwig X agreed to retain the traditional Roman Catholic Church but to make their own reformation of the church within the Duchy, beginning what will eventually become the Counter-Reformation.
- February 27 – Daniil of Volotsk is appointed by the Grand Duke of Moscow as the new Metropolitan of Moscow, becoming the leader of the Russian Orthodox Church.
- February 28 – The Viscount of Lautrec, leader of the French Army, spares the Italian residents of Treviglio from his plan of vengeance for their earlier resistance to the French troops, apparently after witnessing a miracle of seeing a fresco of the Virgin Mary shed tears.
- March 5 – In what is now the Karnataka state of India, Waliullah Shah is installed as the new ruler of Bahmani by the Sultan of Bidar, Amir Barid I.
- March 6 – Protestant reformer Martin Luther returns to Wittenberg in Germany after getting cleared to return home by his protector, Frederick the Wise, Elector of Saxony.
- March 9 –
  - In Zurich in Switzerland, the Affair of the Sausages begins as Pastor Huldrych Zwingli of Grossmünster publicly speaks out against the food restrictions during the Roman Catholic period of fasting during Lent, and advocating that followers of Martin Luther eat sausage, one of the prohibited foods. Zwingli defends his action in the sermon Von Erkiesen und Freiheit der Speisen ("Regarding the freedom of Choice of Foods"), in that the Bible does not prohibit the eating of meat during Lent. The public declaration sparks the Reformation in Zürich.
  - In Wittenberg, as the first day of Lent arrives, Martin Luther begins preaching the first of his eight "Invocavit sermons", stressing the primacy of core Christian values, such as love, patience, charity, and freedom, and reminding his followers to trust God's word rather than violence to bring about necessary change.
- March 31 – Charles V, Holy Roman Emperor, turns over control of the Duchy of Württemberg from the Duke Ulrich to the Emperor's brother, the Archduke Ferdiand of Austria.

=== April–June ===
- April 27 – In the Battle of Bicocca, French and Swiss forces under Odet de Lautrec are defeated by the Spanish in their attempt to retake Milan, and are forced to withdraw into Venetian territory.
- May 10 –Pope Adrian VI, at the request of Spanish Emperor Carlos V, promulgates the papal bull Exponi nobis, allowing members of mendicant orders in the New World to exercise "almost all episcopal authority" when the closest Roman Catholic diocesan bishop is more than two days of travel away.
- May 15 – At Coyoacán in Mexico (at the time, the colony of New Spain) Spanish conquistador Hernán Cortés sends his third report to the Emperor Carlos V, describing the events of the last two years, including the conquest of Tenochtitlan, capital of the Aztec Empire.
- May 28 – The Ottoman Empire's siege of Knin in the Kingdom of Croatia is successful as Mihajlo Vojković surrenders to Gazi Husrev Bey and most of the Croatian inhabitants are allowed to leave. Inhabitants of Bosnia then move in.
- May 29 – England formally declares war on France and Scotland.
- May 30 – In Italy, the siege of Genoa, defended by France against the Holy Roman Imperial armies of General Fernando d'Avalos, ends after 10 days as the Imperial troops overrun the city. Since Genoa had refused to surrender, the Imperial troops are permitted to pillage the fallen city.
- June 19 – Charles V, Holy Roman Emperor visits King Henry VIII of England, and signs the Treaty of Windsor, pledging a joint invasion of France, bringing England into the Italian War of 1521–1526.

=== July–September ===
- July 4 – Brought on ships across the English Channel, an English fleet and army under the command of Thomas Howard, Earl of Surrey, attacks Brittany and Picardy after landing at Le Dourduff-en-Mer, near Calais, and burns and loots the countryside.
- July 23 – A counter-attack by local peasants and the French Army defeats the English Army in the first Battle of Morlaix, the day after the English pillage the town of Morlaix and begin loading their treasure on to their ships. When the French Army, commanded by Guy XVI de Laval, arrives, it finds that most of the English soldiers are either sleeping or drunk after having celebrated a conquest, and about 700 English soldiers are massacred.
- July 28 – Ottoman Sultan Suleiman I begins his siege to expel the Knights of St. John in Rhodes.
- August 3 – Lord Erskine is appointed by Margaret Tudor, regent of Scotland, to be the "keeper" of Margaret's 10-year-old son, King James V, who is to remain within the confines of Erskine's home at Stirling Castle.
- August 15 – Ottoman General Mehmed-Bey of Nikopol enters Târgoviște and takes control of the Principality of Wallachia, now part of Romania, as Radu of Afumați is forced to flee.
- August 27 – The Knights' War erupts within the Holy Roman Empire as Franz von Sickingen leads a revolt against the Prince-Bishop of Trier and to seize the church properties within the Electorate of Trier
- August 31 – Pope Adrian VI is crowned at St. Peter's Basilica in Rome.
- September 6 – A group of 18 men, commanded by Captain Juan Sebastián Elcano, and including Antonio Pigafetta, Maestre Anes and Juan de Zubileta become the first people to have traveled around the world. Arriving on the ship Victoria, they had set off as part of 270 sailors on five ships on the Magellan expedition almost three years earlier. They return to the Spanish port of Sanlúcar de Barrameda, from where they had departed on September 20, 1519.
- September 21 – Luther Bible: Martin Luther's translation of the Bible's New Testament into Early New High German from Greek, Das newe Testament Deutzsch, is published in Germany, selling thousands in the first few weeks.
- September 22 – A 6.8 magnitude earthquake kills more than 2,500 people in the Spanish city of Almería, near Alhama de Almería. It has a maximum felt intensity of X–XI (extreme), making it the most destructive earthquake in Spanish history, and destroys the city, as well as damaging 80 other towns; in Granada, large cracks are observed in various walls and towers.

=== October–December ===
- October 22 – An EMS-X intensity earthquake kills more than 4,000 people on the Azores Islands as its strikes Vila Franca do Campo, the provincial capital, located on São Miguel Island.
- November 17 – The second Diet of Nuremberg opens to discuss various matters of the Holy Roman Empire, including the Protestant Reformation.
- December 18 – The Ottomans finally break into Rhodes, but the Knights continue fierce resistance in the streets.
- December 20 – Suleiman the Magnificent accepts the surrender of the surviving Knights in Rhodes, who are allowed to evacuate. They eventually re-settle on Malta, and become known as the Knights of Malta.

=== Date unknown ===
- The third edition of Erasmus's Greek Textus Receptus of the New Testament, Novum Testamentum (with parallel Latin text), is published in Basel.
- Chinese Ming dynasty War Ministry official He Ru is the first to acquire the Portuguese breech-loading culverin, while copies of them are made by two Westernized Chinese at Beijing, Yang San (Pedro Yang) and Dai Ming.
- Australia is sighted by a Portuguese expedition led by Cristóvão de Mendonça, who maps the continent and names it Jave la Grande ("The Greater Java"), according to the theory of the Portuguese discovery of Australia.
- The Portuguese ally with the Sultanate of Ternate and begin the construction of Fort Kastela.
- The Portuguese, allied with King Ilato of the Goratalo kingdom, construct the Otanaha Fortress.

== Births ==
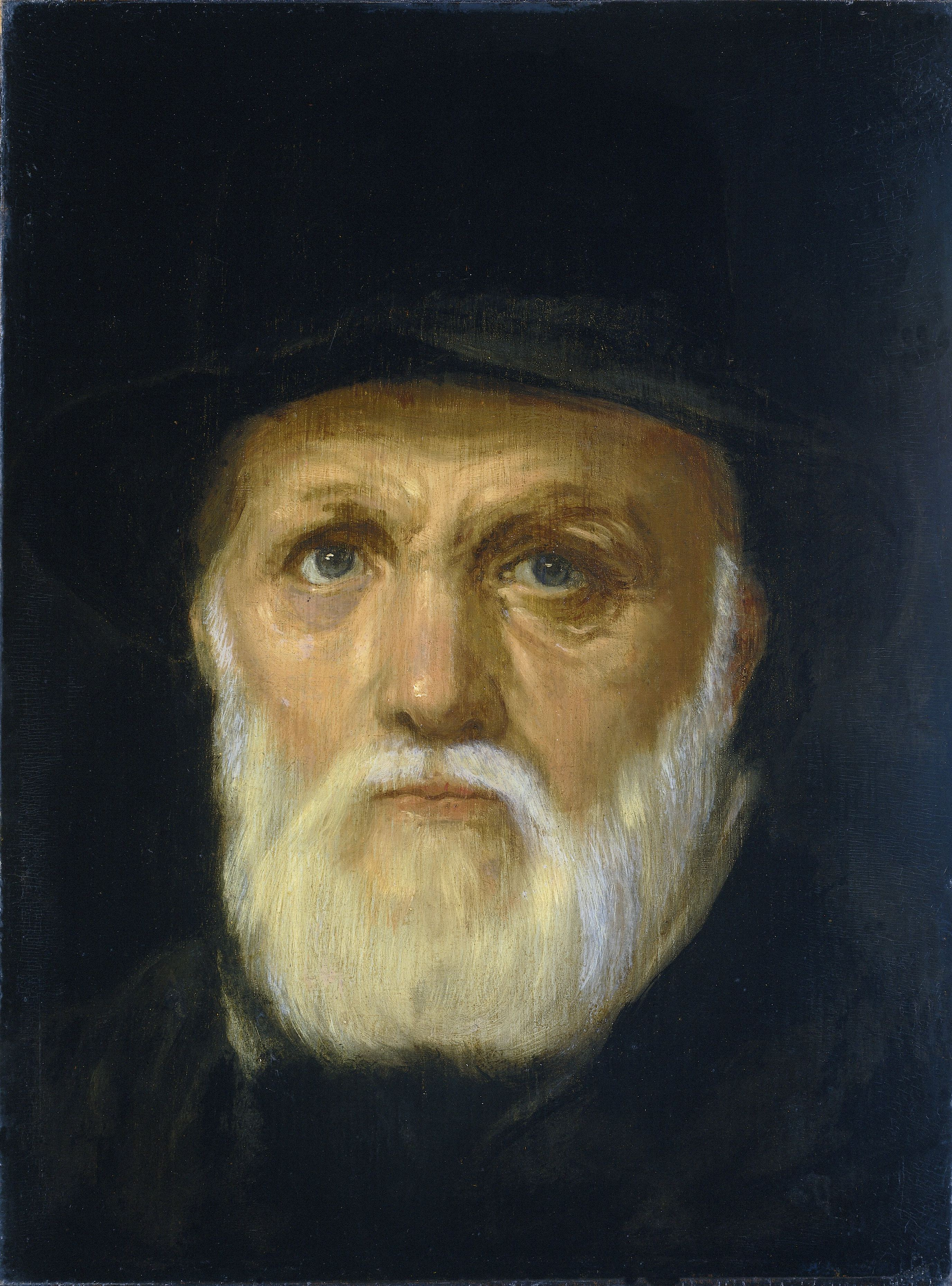
Dirck Coornhert

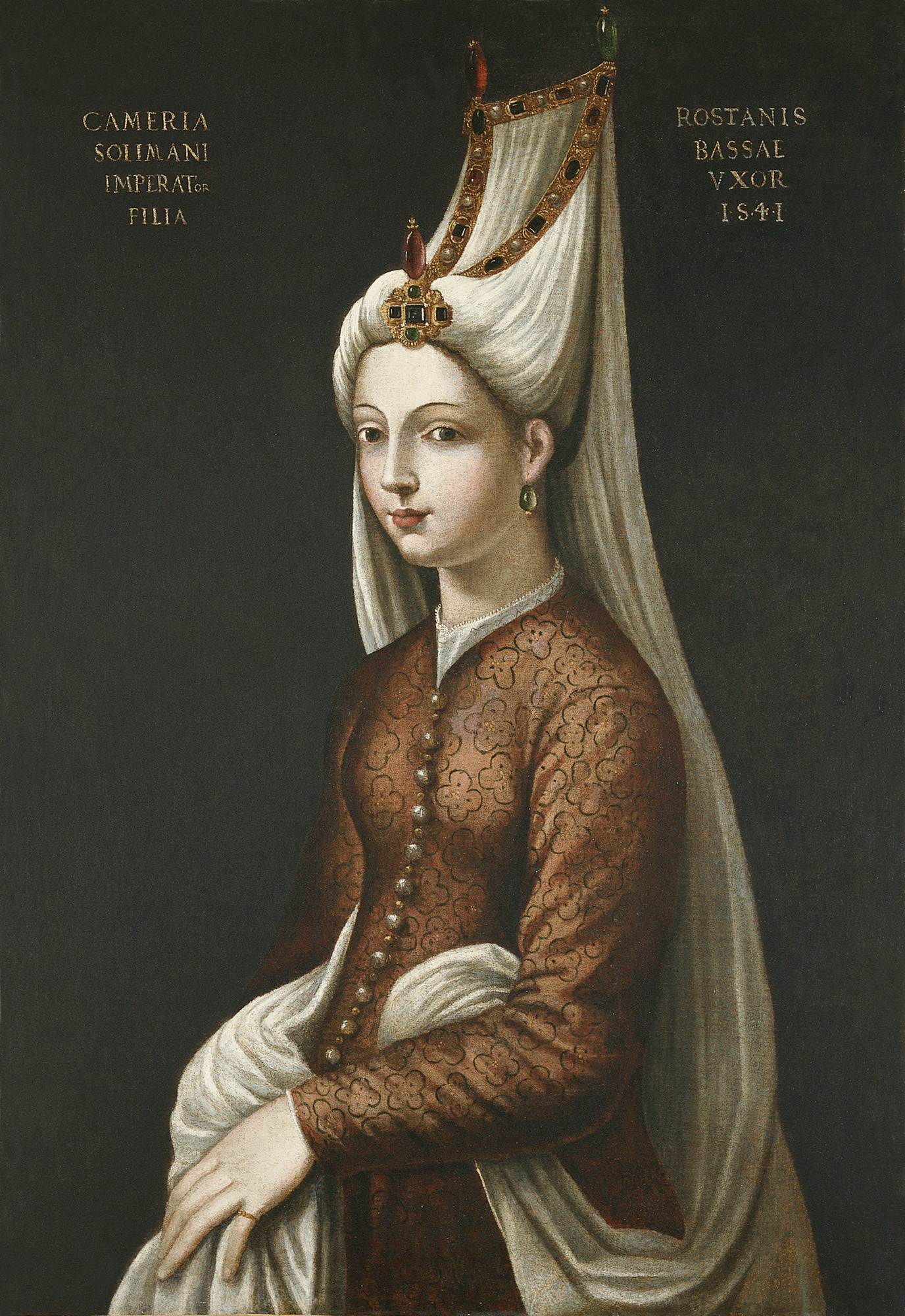
Mihrimah Sultan

- January 22 – Charles II, Duke of Orléans, (d. 1545)
- February 2
  - Lodovico Ferrari, Italian mathematician (d. 1565)
  - Francesco Alciati, Italian Catholic cardinal (d. 1580)
- March 10 – Miyoshi Nagayoshi, Japanese samurai and daimyō (d. 1564)
- March 22 – Daniel Brendel von Homburg, Roman Catholic archbishop (d. 1582)
- March 28 – Albert Alcibiades, German prince (d. 1557)
- April 23 – Catherine of Ricci, Italian prioress (d. 1590)
- May 24 – John Jewel, English bishop (d. 1571)
- June 1 – Dirck Volckertszoon Coornhert, Dutch writer and scholar (d. 1590)
- July 5 – Margaret of Austria, regent of the Netherlands (d. 1586)
- July 13 – Sophia Jagiellon, Duchess of Brunswick-Lüneburg (d. 1575)
- July 25 – Anna of Lorraine (d. 1568)
- July 31 – Charles II de Croÿ, Belgian duke (d. 1551)
- August 4 – Udai Singh II, King of Mewar (d. 1572)
- August 28 – Severinus of Saxony, Prince of Saxony; died young (d. 1533)
- September 11 – Ulisse Aldrovandi, Italian naturalist (d. 1605)
- October 4 – Gabriele Paleotti, Italian Catholic cardinal (d. 1597)
- October 14 – Lucas Maius, Lutheran Reformation pastor, theologian and playwright (d. 1598)
- November 1 – Andrew Corbet, English landowner and politician (d. 1578)
- November 4 – Albert de Gondi, Marshal of France (d. 1602)
- November 9 – Martin Chemnitz, Lutheran reformer (d. 1586)
- November 18 – Lamoral, Count of Egmont, Flemish general and statesman (d. 1568)
- December 16 – Honoré I, Lord of Monaco (d. 1581)
- date unknown
  - Mihrimah Sultan, Ottoman princess (d. 1578)
  - Moses ben Jacob Cordovero, Spanish Jewish rabbi and kabbalist (d. 1570)
  - Philothei, Greek saint (d. 1589)
  - Jacques Cujas, French legal expert (d. 1590)
- probable
  - Emperor Gelawdewos of Ethiopia (d. 1559)
- possible
  - Catherine Howard, fifth queen of Henry VIII of England, (b. between 1518 and 1524; d. 1542)

== Deaths ==
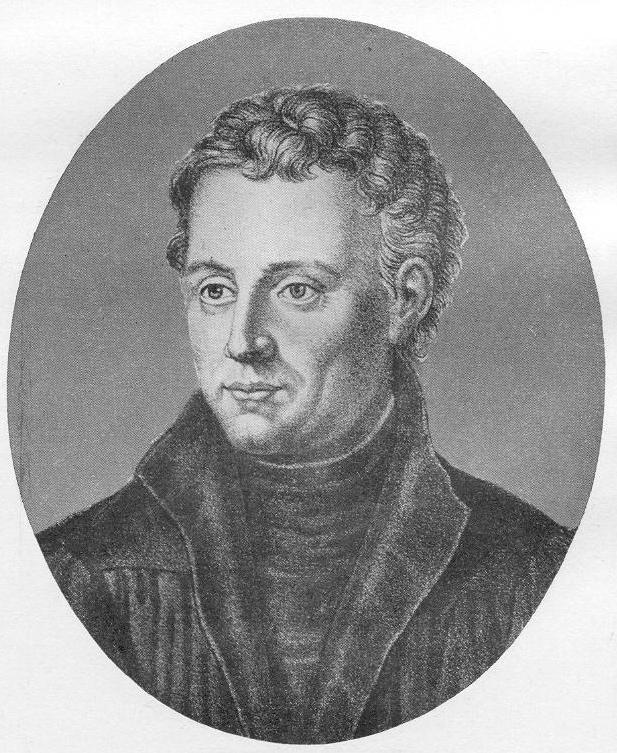
Johann Reuchlin

- January 25 – Raffaello Maffei, Italian theologian (b. 1451)
- January 29 – Wolfgang I of Oettingen, German count (b. 1455)
- February 25 – William Lilye, English classical scholar (b. c. 1468)
- April – Queen Eleni of Ethiopia
- April 10 – Francesco Cattani da Diacceto, Italian philosopher (b. 1466)
- June 13 – Piero Soderini, Florentine statesman (b. 1450)
- June 24 – Elisabeth of the Palatinate, Landgravine of Hesse, German noble (b. 1483)
- June 25 – Franchinus Gaffurius, Italian composer (b. 1451)
- June 30 – Johann Reuchlin, German humanist and Hebrew scholar (b. 1455)
- August 28 – Giovanni Antonio Amadeo, sculptor, engineer and architect
- September – Gavin Douglas, Scottish poet and bishop (b. c. 1474)
- October 30 – Jean Mouton, French composer (b. c. 1459)
- November 14 – Anne of France, Princess and Regent of France (b. 1461)
- date unknown – Fiorenzo di Lorenzo, Italian painter (b. 1440)
