= Trinidad (ship) =

Flagship of the Magellan expedition

- 1906 illustration of Nao Trinidad in a squall

History

Spain
- Owner: Crown of Spain
- Fate: Wrecked c.1523
- Notes: Part of the Magellan expedition

General characteristics
- Type: nao
- Tonnage: 100–110 tonels
- Complement: 61

Trinidad (Spanish for "Trinity") was the flagship (capitana) of Ferdinand Magellan's 1519–1522 voyage of circumnavigation. Unlike the Victoria, which successfully returned to Spain after sailing across the Indian Ocean under the command of Juan Sebastián Elcano, Trinidad attempted yet failed to sail east across the Pacific to New Spain.

Trinidad was a nao (carrack) of 100 or 110 tonels (Note: Note that many English sources such as Joyner provide these numbers calqued as "tons" without converting their values from the actual unit, the Biscayan tonel ("tun"). At the time of Magellan's voyage, this tonel was reckoned as 1.2 toneladas, giving the Trinidad a capacity of roughly 120-132 toneladas, 170–203 m³, 6000–7200 cu. ft., or 60—72 English shipping tons.) with square sails on the fore and main masts and a lateen mizzen. Its original crew was 61.

== History ==
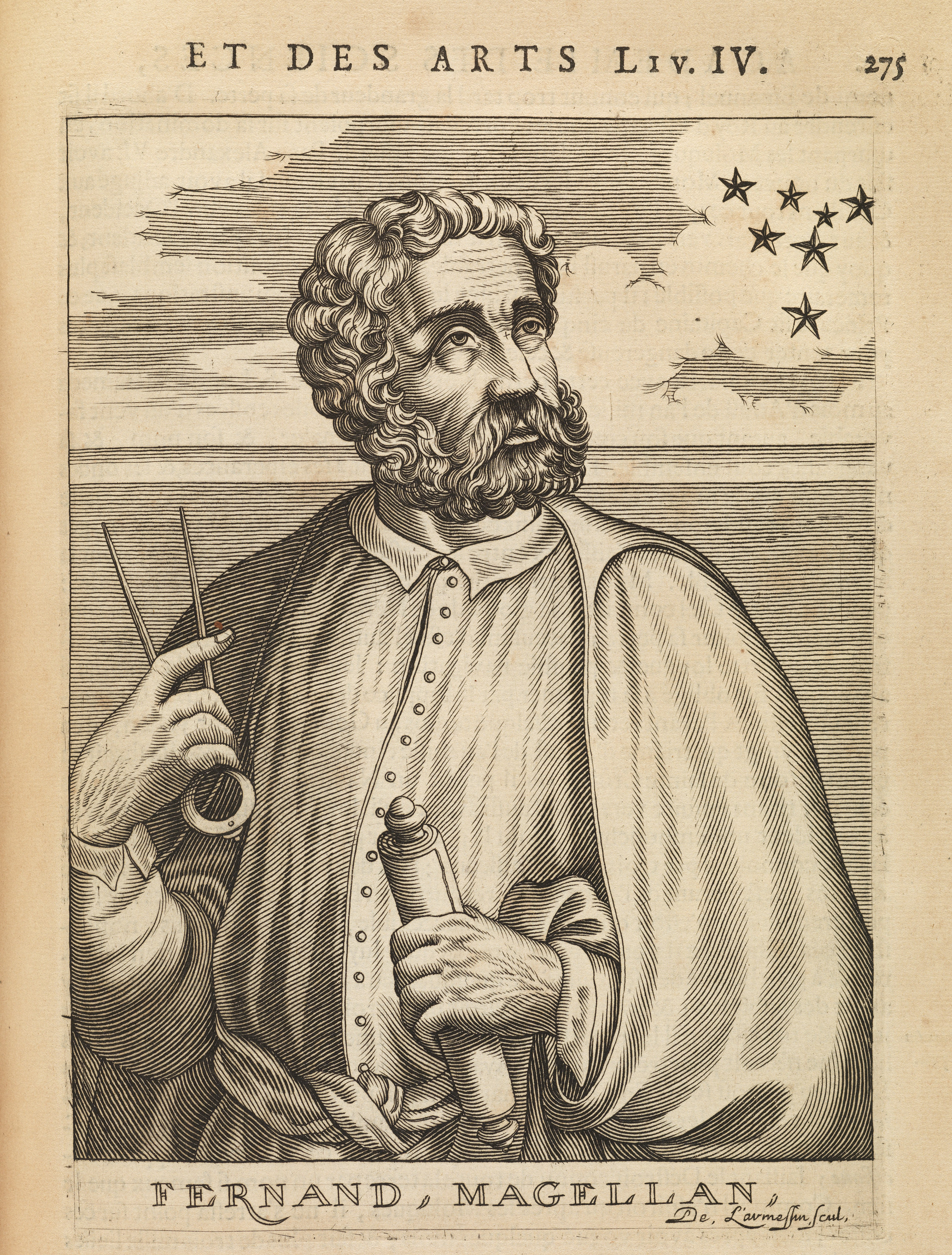
Ferdinand Magellan, 1682 illustration. Nao Trinidad was Magellan's flagship on the 1519–1522 expedition

After Magellan's death and the burning of the Concepción, Victoria and Trinidad (the San Antonio and the Santiago being lost earlier) reached Tidore on 8 November 1521. In mid-December both ships attempted to depart loaded with cloves, but Trinidad almost immediately began to leak badly. Inspection showed that the problem was serious. It was agreed that Victoria would leave for Spain and Trinidad would remain for repairs.

On 6 April 1522, Trinidad left Tidore loaded with 50 tonels of cloves. Her commander was Gonzalo Gomez de Espinosa, Magellan's alguacil (master-at-arms), a good soldier, but no sailor. After ten days Trinidad put in at one of the Marianas, where three men deserted, and then headed northeast. Espinosa was apparently trying to reach the Westerlies, but did not find them, probably because of the summer monsoon. He reached 42 or 43 degrees north in increasingly bad weather. Scurvy set in, ultimately killing 30 men and leaving only 20 to sail the ship. Five months after leaving, he turned back and two months later reached the Moluccas.

=== Capture by Portuguese forces ===
The previous May a fleet of seven Portuguese ships under António de Brito reached Tidore, seeking to arrest Magellan. Espinosa sent Brito a letter begging for supplies. Brito sent an armed party to capture Trinidad, but, instead of armed resistance, they found only a ship on the verge of sinking and a crew near death. Trinidad was sailed back to Ternate where her sails and rigging were removed. The ship was caught in a storm and smashed to pieces.

=== Crew after capture ===
Only four of the survivors got back to Europe. Juan Rodriguez escaped in a Portuguese ship. The remaining three – commander Espinosa, seaman and expedition diarist Ginés de Mafra, and Norwegian gunner Hans Vargue (or Bergen) – spent two years at hard labor before being shipped to Lisbon and more prison. Vargue died in the Portuguese prison. (Note: In Bergreen's book his name is noted as Hans Vargue at the end of the book, and as Hans Bergen in the beginning.) Espinosa is last heard of in 1543 as a Spanish inspector of ships.

De Mafra, the last to be released because of the many documents he possessed, in time did become a pilot — in part because of the experience he gained with Magellan's expedition. In 1541 he was named pilot of the San Juan de Letrán under Ruy López de Villalobos; two years later, wrecked on a Philippine island, he wrote about the Magellan expedition while waiting on ship repairs. Here the Magellan expedition was remembered favorably by royalty, and ultimately he with 29 other men chose to remain in the Philippines rather than resume with the failing Villalobos expedition. De Mafra's notes from his wait remained unpublished until found in 1920. (Note: Spaniard diarist Gines de Mafra's assessment of Espinosa is controversial and sometimes described as biased. De Mafra may have been dismayed at the commander's decision to go back the way they came, rather than continue west towards Africa.)
