= Loaísa expedition =

Castilian travel to Southeast Asia in the 16th century

- Country: Spanish Empire
- Leader: García Jofre de Loaysa
- Start: 24 July 1525
- End: September 1526 (reached Spice Islands); 1536 (returned to Spain)
- Goal: Colonize Spice Islands, rescue Trinidad
- Ships: 7
- Crew: 450
- Survivors: 79, including 50 aboard Santiago and 4 rescued from Sangir

Route
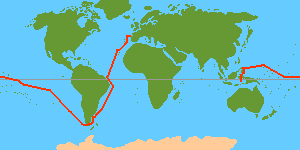

The Loaísa expedition was an early 16th-century Spanish voyage of discovery to the Pacific Ocean, commanded by García Jofre de Loaísa (1490 – 20 July 1526) and ordered by King Charles I of Spain to colonize the Spice Islands in the East Indies. The seven-ship fleet sailed from La Coruña, Spain in July 1525 and became the second naval expedition in history to cross the Pacific Ocean, after the Magellan-Elcano circumnavigation. The expedition resulted in the discovery of the Sea of Hoces south of Cape Horn, and the Marshall Islands in the Pacific. One ship ultimately arrived in the Spice Islands in September 1526.

== Origins ==
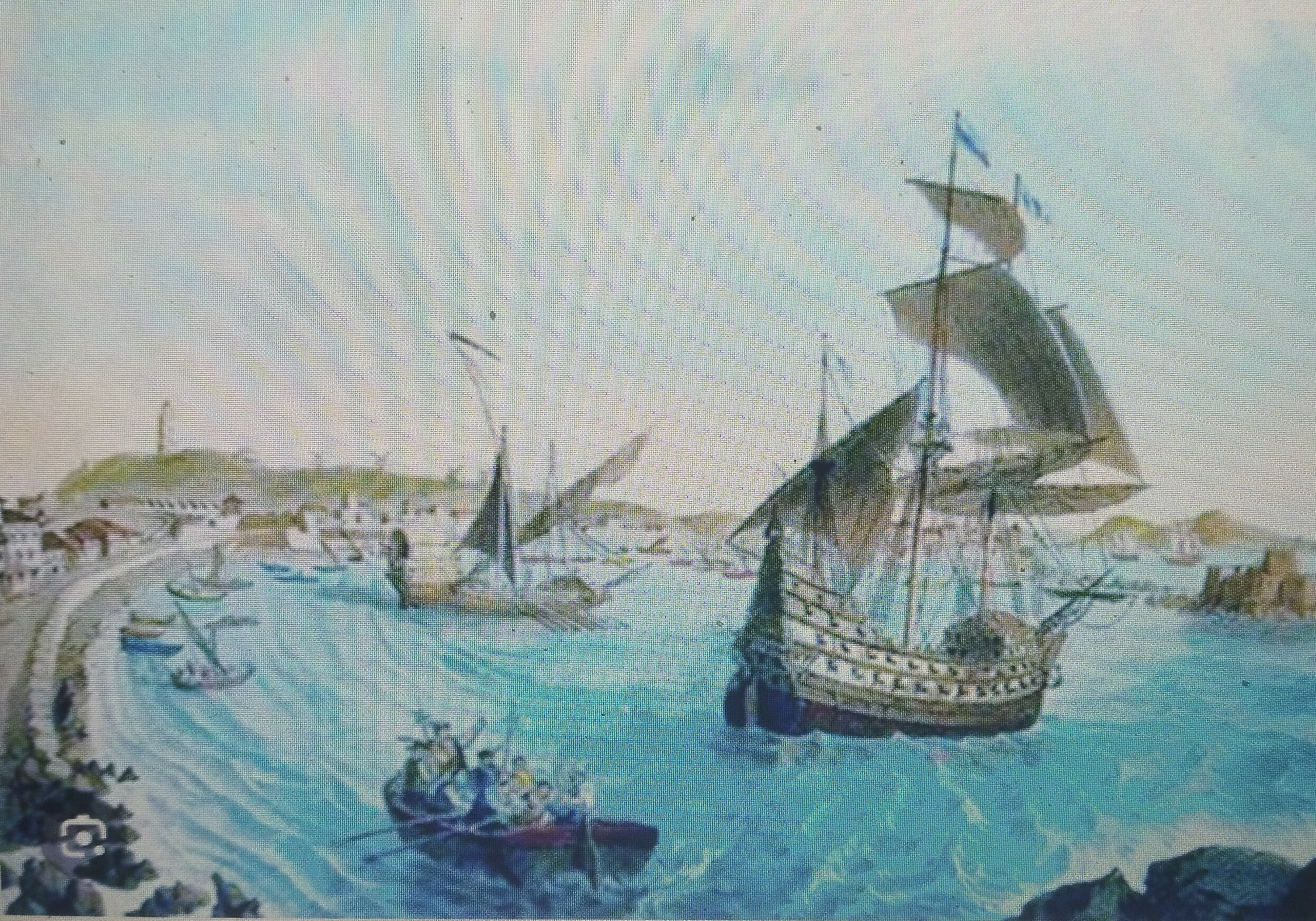

De Loaísa's expedition was conceived both as a rescue mission and a voyage of discovery. The Victoria, a vessel from Magellan's expedition to the Pacific, had returned to Spain in 1522 with word that her sister ship the Trinidad had last been seen attempting to return home by sailing east from the Spice Islands to South America. De Loaísa was ordered to seek Trinidad, or news of her fate, by voyaging along her expected return route to Spain. Failing this he was to locate and colonise Magellan's Spice Islands, and also to bring back news of Tarshish and Ophir, where, according to the Bible, King Solomon, exploited precious metals and gems (Spanish scholars believed that those biblical islands might be somewhere near China). For this purpose, de Loaísa was assigned seven vessels and a total of 450 men, including tradesmen and administrators for the Spice Islands settlement.

== Atlantic voyage ==
The expedition set sail from Corunna on 24 July 1525. It consisted of seven ships, Santa María de la Victoria, Sancti Spiritus, Anunciada, San Gabriel, Santa María del Parral and San Lesmes and a patache, Santiago. De Loaísa was named captain along with Juan Sebastián Elcano, who had reached the Spice Islands in 1521 during the Magellan expedition.

The fleet headed southwest to the Canary Islands and then south along the African coastline. In November 1525 de Loaísa moved west across the Atlantic to Brazil, reaching the Patagonian shore in January 1526. There was no sign of Trinidad, and de Loaísa decided to abandon the search for her and continue instead to the Spice Islands. However the weather was poor, and over the next several weeks, in high winds while trying to enter the Strait of Magellan, the ships alternately gathered and dispersed. Two ships, Sancti Spiritus and Anunciada were wrecked, and one, San Gabriel tacked into the Atlantic and deserted the expedition.

The San Lesmes under the captaincy of Francisco de Hoces was driven south along the coast, possibly to a latitude of 57°, where the crew noted "an end of land" which could have been the first European sighting of Cape Horn. After some difficulty Hoces was able to steer his galleon northward once more, rejoining the other three vessels that remained with the expedition. On 26 May 1526, this diminished fleet of four ships (three galleons and the patache), passed through the Strait and entered the Pacific.

== Pacific voyage ==
The bad weather which had originally scattered de Loaísa's fleet continued in the Pacific. The four remaining vessels quickly lost sight of each other in the heavy rain and were unable to regroup when the storm finally passed on 1 June.

The Santiago sailed north, and in a 10,000-kilometre voyage, reached the Pacific coast of Mexico in July 1526, achieving the first navigation from Europe to the western coast of North America. 50 people survived and some of them took part in the expedition commanded by Álvaro de Saavedra which would also cross the Pacific between 1527 and 1529.

The San Lesmes disappeared entirely. Twentieth century speculation suggests she ran aground in the Tuamotus, either on the island of Anaa where a 1774 expedition found a cross erected on the beach, or off the Amanu atoll where an old Spanish cannon was later found.

The third ship, Santa María del Parral, sailed the Pacific to Sangir off the northern coast of Sulawesi, where the ship was beached and its crew were variously killed or enslaved by the natives. Four survivors were rescued in 1528 by Álvaro de Saavedra Cerón's Spanish expedition coming from Mexico.

The last galleon, Santa Maria de la Victoria, was the only ship to reach the Spice Islands, landing in September 1526.

== Survivors ==
Loaísa himself died on 30 July 1526 and Elcano a few days later, and Alonso de Salazar three weeks after that. Yñiguez reached the islands of Visayas and Mindanao in the Philippines and the Moluccas, but died of food poisoning. Only Andrés de Urdaneta and 24 other men survived to land in the Spice Islands. They returned to Spain in 1536 in the Portuguese India Armada and under Portuguese guard to complete the second world circumnavigation in history. One of the survivors was Maestre Anes (Hans von Aachen), who previously served as gunner on the Victoria under Magellan and Elcano, becoming the first man to circumnavigate twice. He subsequently joined the disastrous Villalobos Expedition whose survivors composed the third group of circumnavigators.

== Theories of the wreck of the San Lesmes ==
Australian researcher Robert Adrian Langdon hypothesised that the San Lesmes, after being lost in a storm off the coast of South America, deviated through the Pacific Ocean, stopping in Tahiti, before being wrecked on the coast of New Zealand. French historian Roger Hervé claimed that the Spanish caravel was diverted to Tasmania also, until it went up the Australian eastern coast and was captured by the Portuguese near what is now Cape York. New Zealand film maker Winston Cowie assesses the San Lesmes theory in his books Nueva Zelanda, un puzzle histórico: tras la pista de los conquistadores españoles and Conquistador Puzzle Trail, the Spanish version of which was completed with the support of the Embassy of Spain to New Zealand, adding the oral tradition of the Pouto Peninsula to Langdon's work. Cowie concludes that there is a possibility that the San Lesmes was wrecked on the Pouto Peninsula, with more research required to take the theory from possibility to probability. Contemporary of Cowie's, Noel Hilliam found a wreck on Aranga about 90 kilometres (56 mi) north of the Pouto Peninsular which he claimed was the San Lesmes but the find was neither verified nor conclusive.

== See also ==
- History of the Philippines

== Notes ==
=== Bibliography ===
- Blanco, Francisco Mellén. "García Jofre de Loaysa". Real Academia de la Historia (in Spanish).
- Berguno, Jorge (1990). "The South and Mid-Pacific Voyages". In Hardy, John; Frost, Alan (eds.). European Voyaging towards Australia. Australian Academy of the Humanities. ISBN 0909897190.
- Kelsey, Harry (April 1986). "Finding the Way Home: Spanish Exploration of the Round-Trip Route across the Pacific Ocean". The Western Historical Quarterly. 17 (2). United States: Utah State University: 145–164. doi:10.2307/969278. JSTOR 969278.
- Nowell, Charles E. (December 1936). "The Loaisa Expedition and the Ownership of the Moluccas". Pacific Historical Review. 5 (4). United States: University of California Press: 325–336. doi:10.2307/3632888. JSTOR 3632888.
