= Tonel (unit) =

A tonel was a historic unit of measurement used with various meanings in Spanish and Portuguese-speaking regions during the early modern period. It was used to measure the capacity of ships, and is believed to have been derived from the size of a wine keg. It was equal to 1.2 toneladas.

== Ship Capacity ==
The tonel was the unit used to measure the capacity of ships in the regions bordering the Bay of Biscay, in the same way as the tonelada was used in Seville for the Indies trade route. Twelve toneladas were equal to ten toneles. A document from February 13, 1552 declares that the capacity of ships that could be sailed to the Indies was "one hundred toneles machos" or greater; thus the tonel macho was the same as the tonelada, which was a unit of two pipes (pipas), each of twenty-seven and a half arrobas. It has been proposed that the tonel gave its name to the space it occupied, and therefore, to the tonelada. In the second half of the 16th century the tonelada came to be used to express the official tonnage of a ship, while the tonel macho was used to measure the actual capacity of the ships holds. After the Spanish King Phillip II sought to standardize nautical measurements in 1590, the volume of the tonel macho became adopted as the standard and the term tonelada became predominant for the unified measure.

== See Also ==
- Barrel (unit)
