= Maestre Anes =

Member of the first circumnavigation under Magellan 1519–1522

Magellan expedition, with milestones marked

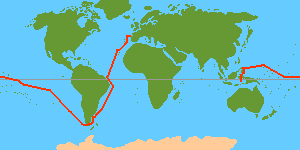
Loaísa expedition

Maestre Anes (circa 1500; † 1542/45, also “Juan Alemán de Aquisgrán”, “Hans from Aachen”) was a member of the first circumnavigation under Ferdinand Magellan 1519–1522 and one of the 18 surviving returnees under Elcano. He sailed around the world again as a participant in the Loaísa Expedition (1525–1526), making him the first German circumnavigator and the first person to circumnavigate the earth twice.

== Career ==
According to the team list, he came from Aachen and was the son of a certain Juan Pahulo and a Sofia.

He was hired as a gunner (lombardero) on the Victoria and arrived back in Spain on September 22, 1522, as one of 18 survivors under Elcano.

In 1525 he sailed with the Loaisa expedition again under Elcano and with other veterans of the first circumnavigation to the Moluccas, but was stranded there in 1526. In 1528 he and the rest of the crew of the Loaisa expedition were found and taken by the Saavedra Expedition, which was sent by Cortés from Mexico. They tried to get back to Mexico across the Pacific, but failed just like the Trinidad a few years earlier and returned to the Moluccas, where the crew fell into the hands of the Portuguese.

Only four survivors of the Loaisa and Saavedra expedition were able to return to Europe in 1534, including Hans, the only one of Elcano's veterans, who became the first person to circumnavigate the world twice.

In 1542 he took part in the Villalobos Expedition via Mexico with the destination Philippines, but apparently died on this journey at an unknown location

Maestre Anes (Hans von Aachen) is often confused in older literature with Hans Varga, another German-born circumnavigator of the Magellan expedition who died during that voyage.

With two completed and one started circumnavigations of the world, Hans von Aachen was probably the furthest traveled person until the journeys of Loyolas.

== Cultural depictions ==
Raoul Schrott made Maestre Anes the protagonist of his novel A Story of the Wind.
