= San Antonio (carrack) =

Spanish ship in Magellan's 1519–22 expedition

History

Spain
- Notes: Part of the Magellan expedition

General characteristics
- Type: nao
- Tonnage: 144 toneladas
- Propulsion: Sail
- Complement: 57

San Antonio or San Antón was a Spanish carrack that was part of the Magellan expedition. It was involved in the discovery of the Falkland Islands, with the most widely distributed account attributing the discovery of the Falkland Islands to Esteban Gómez, the pilot of the ship, whose name was initially given to the islands (referred to as "Sansón").

== Background ==
The papal bulls Inter Caetera and Dudum siquidem of 1493 granted to the Crown of Castille "all the islands and lands, discovered and yet to be discovered in the south" (Note: Spanish: todas aquellas islas y tierras firmes, encontradas y que se encuentren, descubiertas y que se descubran hacia el mediodía), fixed by a line 100 leagues from the Azores. The Falklands Islands were included in the zone referred to by the bulls.

The Hispanic Monarchy provided a fleet under the command of Ferdinand Magellan to go to the Spice Islands, provided they were found located within the Spanish region and were not "touching" the Portuguese islands. The fleet was named at the time "Spice Armada" (Note: Spanish: Armada de la Especiería) or "Magellan's Armada" (Note: Spanish: Armada de Magallanes). The expedition concluded with the first circumnavigation of the world (1519–1522), with the ship Victoria, captained by Juan Sebastián Elcano, being the only ship to complete the full circumnavigation.

== History ==
The expedition consisted of five ships and 234 men and embarked from Sanlúcar de Barrameda, in the province of Cádiz, on the 20th of September, 1519. The San Antonio cost 330,000 maravedíes, and with a capacity of 120 toneles (144 toneladas), had the most capacity of any ship in the expedition. The ship had a crew of 57 men. Magellan put the ship under the command of Juan de Cartagena, with whom he would have serious conflicts, eventually giving the command to Antonio de Coca and later to Álvaro de Mezquita.

At San Julian Bay (now in Santa Cruz Province, Argentina), there was a mutiny against Magellan by Juan de Cartagena, Gaspar de Quesada, captain of the Concepción, Luis de Mendoza, captain of the Victoria, and other officers of the expedition. This resulted in San Antonio falling into the hand of the mutineers, with Juan Sebastián Elcano becoming its new captain. Despite the mutineers controlling three of the five ships of the fleet, the situation turned in favor of Magellan, who took the Victoria by surprise, and the mutiny failed. Ultimately Mezquita was restored to the command of San Antonio.

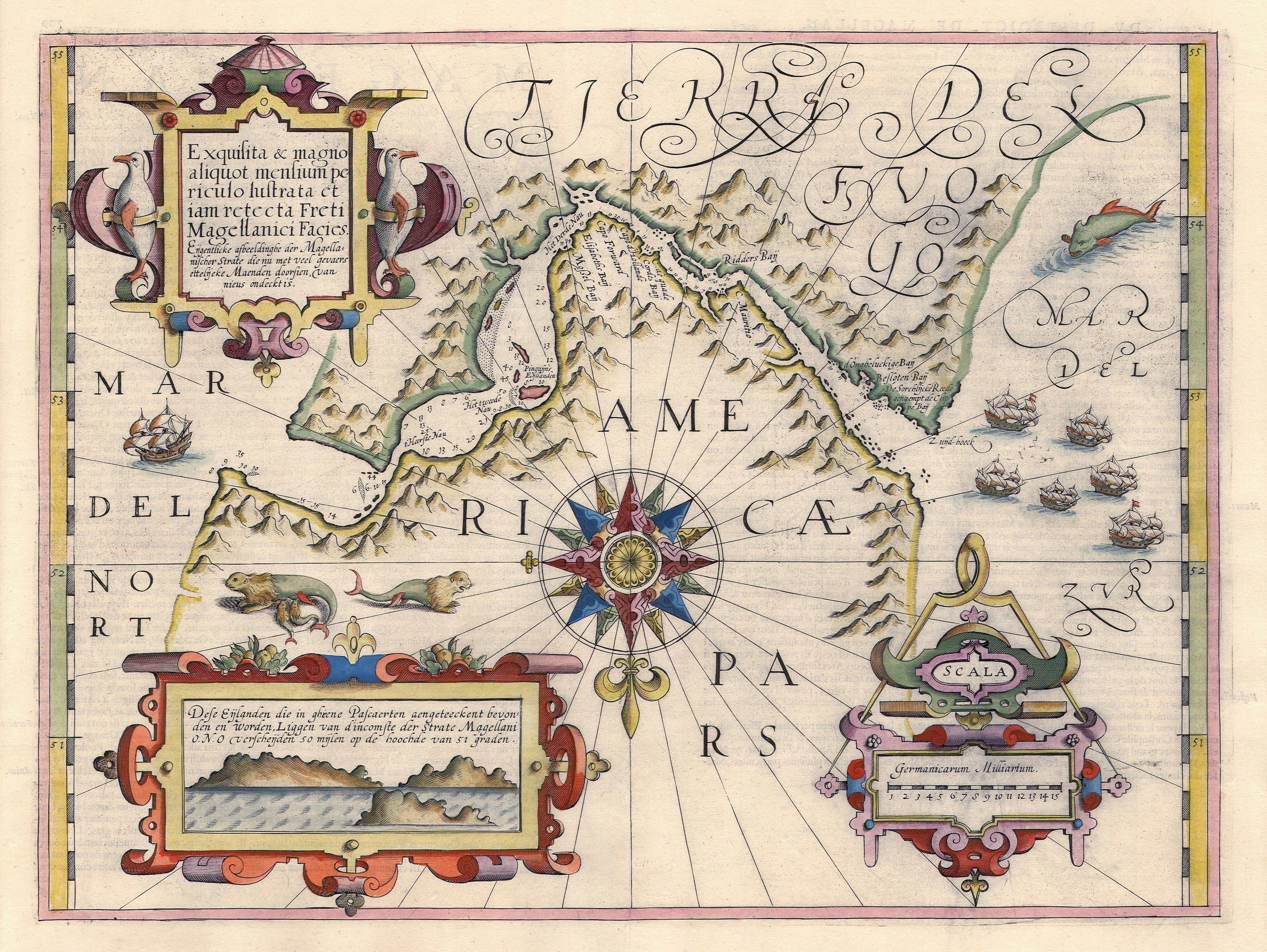
Map by Jodocus Hondius of the Strait of Magellan, 1606.

On 21 October 1520 the fleet assembled off the Cape of Eleven Thousand Virgins and due to the shape of the coastline San Antonio was sent with Concepción in search of confirmation whether there was a passage between the oceans.

Having verified the water passage (the Strait of Magellan), Esteban Gómez of the San Antonio advised that they should return and report their discovery, and idea which Magellan discarded, but not Gómez. Accordingly, a new scouting expedition was sent consisting of this ship and Concepción. But Gómez planned to return, and rebelling against Magellan on November, 1520, deposed Álvaro de Mezquita, took command of the San Antonio, and altered course to leave the main channel and set course for Spain. As this was the largest and best-provisioned ship of the fleet, this did great harm to the rest of crews in their crossing of the Pacific Ocean.

After rebelling against Magellan, Gómez returned to Spain by way of Guinea and arrived in Seville on the 6th of May, 1521. He was subjected to a trial in which no mention was made of anything that could be described as the Falkland Islands. Esteban Gómez provided an indigenous person to the cartographer Diego Ribero in 1529, so that he could obtain a direct account of the Sansón islands.

== Discovery of the Falkland Islands ==
Mapamundi by Diego Ribero, 1529.

One account of the discovery states that when the expedition wintered at Puerto San Julián, Magellan ordered an exploration of the region by the ship San Antonio, under the command of Jerónimo Guerra and with Gómez as pilot. Upon discovering the islands, they named them Sansón. Another account states that after rebelling against Magellan, the 55 deserters first returned to the Patagonian coast to recover the castaways (though they did not find them) and then set course towards the Cape of Good Hope (in Africa), where they sighted unknown lands that turned out to be the Falkland Islands.

The name Sansón could refer to the mythological giant of the Tehuelches of the continent or could be because that day was the day of Saint Sansón. It is said that the Frenchman Bernard Calmette, chaplain of the San Antonio, named the island for the saint of the day. According to the Uruguayan researcher Rolando Laguarda Trías the discovery should have been in the end of July 1520, since the 28 was the say of Saint Sansón. The name San Antonio is also used to refer to the archipelago.

Yet another version attributes the discovery to the ship Victoria, which was sent by Magellan to track the San Antón in the waters of the Atlantic Ocean. These two ships were the only of the expedition that could return to Spain. Dom Pernety in his book Historia de un viaje a las Islas Malvinas, originally published in 1770, states that Magellan himself sighted the islands but did not make landfall.

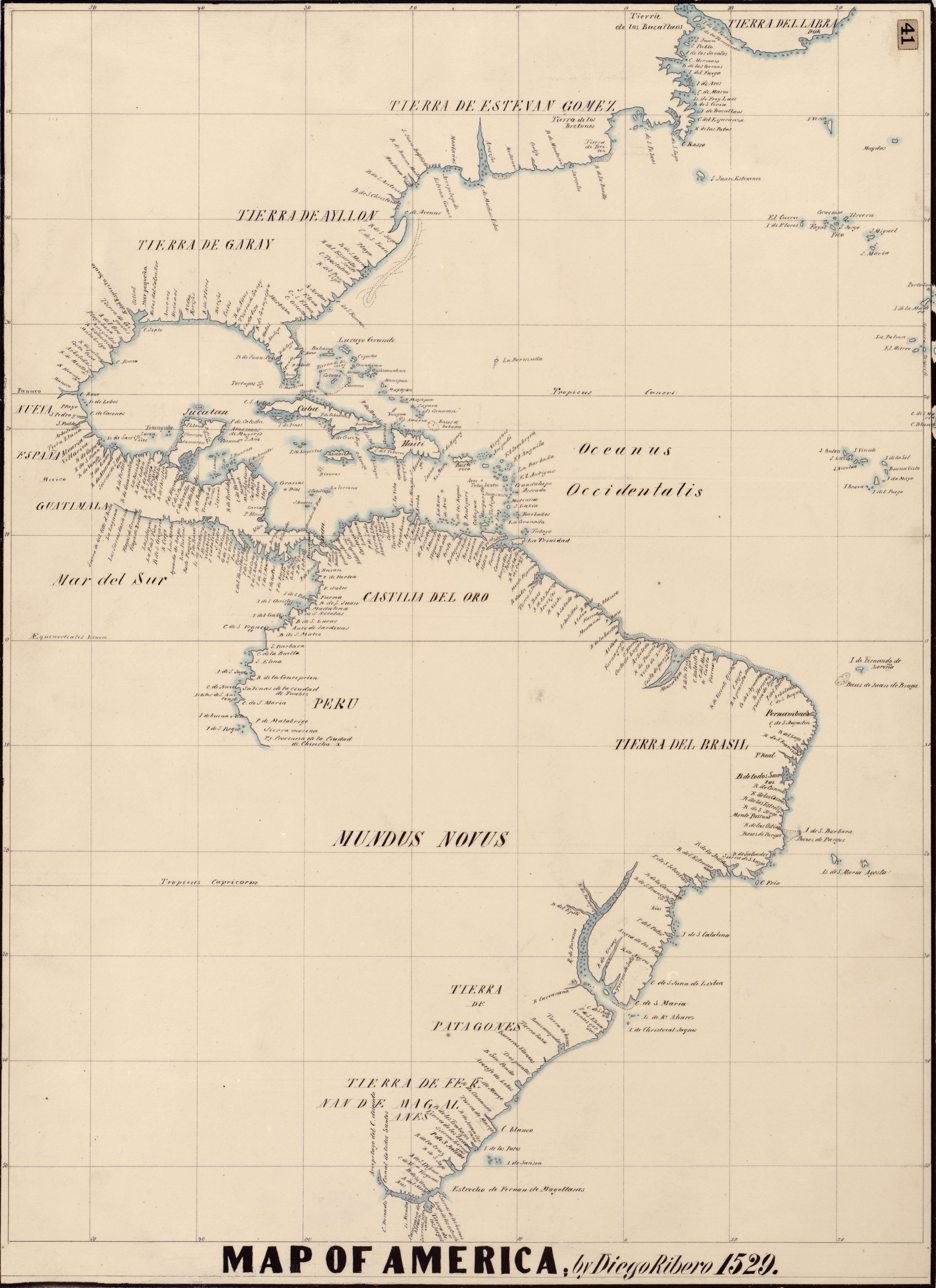
Detail of a map of American coast drawn by hand in the 19th century, from the mapamundi of 1529 by Diego Ribero, showing the islands of Sansón near to the location of the Falkland Islands.

After the Magellan expedition, the islands began to appear in the cartography of the era. The first map in which the islands appear was in 1522, when Pedro Reinel drew an important collection of islands in the South Atlantic called Sansón. In the cartography of Diego de Ribero, the Carta universal en que se contiene todo lo que del mundo se ha descubierto fasta agora of 1527 and of 1529, two groups of islands can be seen in the region: the eight or nine islands called "Sansón", at 49° south but halfway to the coast of the Falklands and the islands "de los Patos" very close to the coast. In the 1533 update these last are not included. Much later the islands Sansón continued to appear in the maps of: Islario by Alonso de Santa Cruz (1541), Battista Agnese (1536–1545), Sebastian Cabot (1547), Darinel (1555), Diego Gutiérrez (1562), Bartolomé Olives (1562), Jorge Sideri (1563), Martínez (1577), José Rosacio (1580), etc., located always more to the north and closer to the coast than the Falklands. In these charts the islands appear with the labels of "San Antón", "S. Antón", "Sansón", "Sanson", or "San Son". By 1590 the islands already appeared in Spanish and Italian navigation plans.

The Sansón islands also appear the Yslario general de todas las yslas del mundo in 1541. In the map Le grand insulaire et pilotage in 1586 the islands ("de Sansón" or "de los Gigantes") also appear with a comment:

Los primeros que pusieron pie en estas islas fueron portugueses, que acompañaban a Hernando de Magallanes en su viaje.

The first to set foot on these islands were Portuguese, who accompanied Ferdinand Magellan on his voyage.

No mentions of the sighting have been found in the surviving accounts from the voyage: the diaries of Antonio Pigafetta, of the pilot es:Francisco Albo, the Roteiro dof a Genoese piolot, or the account of Maximilianus Transylvanus. Although most of the writings of Magellan have been lost, as well as the entire ships log of Juan Serrano and its descriptions of San Julián south, the absence of references in the accounts in the logbooks cited cast doubt on the truth of this hypothesis. Nonetheless, in 1983 the historian Rolando Laguarda Trías found a document in the Bibliothèque nationale de France, written by the friar André Thevet in Le Gran Insulaire. Vol I, dated to 1586 (six years before the first British precedent), that includes a map on page 229 in which "Les isles de Sansón ou des Geants" (the islands "of Sansón" or "of the giants") appears in surprising geographic correspondence with the Falkland Islands. Thevet mentions in the adjoining text that he had obtained the position and description of the achipelago from a Portuguese member of the Magellan expedition, probably Álvaro de Mezquita, an eyewitness of the sighting, whom he interviewed in Lisbon.

An account also exists that states that Amerigo Vespucci had sighted the islands in 1502. The historians Goebel and Destéfani, among others, consider that the ship Incógnita, commanded by Alonso de Camargo as part of the fleet commanded by Francisco de la Ribera and funded by Gutierre de Vargas Carvajal, Bishop of Plasencia, was the discoverer of the islands in 1540.

== See also ==
- History of the Falkland Islands

== Bibliography ==
- Bandieri, Susana (2005). Historia de la Patagonia. Buenos Aires: Sudamericana. ISBN 9500722178.
- Destefani, Laurio H. (1982). Malvinas, Georgias y Sandwich del Sur ante el conflicto con Gran Bretaña. Buenos Aires: Edipress. ISBN 978-950-01-6904-2.
- Goebel, Julius (1983). La pugna por las islas Malvinas - Un estudio de la historia legal y diplomática. Yale University Press.
- Laguarda Trías, Rolando A. (1983). "Nave Española descubre las islas Malvinas en 1520". C. De la Academia de Marinha de Lisboa, del Instituto Histórico e Geografico Brasileiro y de la Real Sociedad Geográfica de Madrid. Montevideo.
- Lorenz, Federico (2014). Todo lo que necesitás saber sobre Malvinas (1° ed.). Buenos Aires: Paidós. ISBN 9789501204049.
- Lorenz, Federico (2013). Unas islas demasiado famosas: Malvinas, historia y política (1° ed.). Buenos Aires: Capital Intelectual. ISBN 9789876144018.
- Martínez Casado, Gisela (2010). Malvinas, nuestro legado francés (Primera ed.). Buenos Aires: Argenta Sarlep S.A. ISBN 978950887420.
- Fernández de Navarrete, Martín (1837). Expediciones al Maluco, viage de Magallanes y de Elcano. Imprenta Nacional.
