= Ginés de Mafra =

Spanish explorer

- Born: 1493; Jérez de la Frontera, Spain
- Died: 1546 (aged 52–53)

Ginés de Mafra (1493–1546) was a Spanish explorer who sailed with the Magellan expedition in search of a western passage to Asia. His later account of the voyage is an important supplement to the historical record. In 1536 he served as the chief pilot for Pedro de Alvarado on a voyage to Peru and in 1542 he sailed with Ruy López de Villalobos to the Philippines.

== History ==
Mafra was born in the town of Jérez de la Frontera, in the province of Cádiz, Andalusia. He later became a resident of Palos de la Frontera in southern Spain. In court documents dated August 1527, Mafra stated he was 33 years old, indicating he was probably born around 1493 or 1494.

=== Voyage to the Philippine Islands ===
In 1519, he became a crew member of the Magellan expedition. Mafra started as a seaman in the galleon Trinidad, the armada's flagship. In 1521, after many hardships, the expedition reached the Philippines where Magellan was killed in a battle with the islanders. The only remaining ships, the Victoria and Trinidad (with Mafra still on board) decided to split up and find their own ways home. The Victoria continued west and eventually became the first ship to circumnavigate the globe. Meanwhile, the Trinidad planned to retrace their path across the Pacific but were unable to make much headway and were eventually captured by the Portuguese in the Moluccas.

Mafra and his surviving crewmates were held captive in the Moluccas and then in 1523 transported to Cochin on the east coast of India where most of his companions died from mistreatment and disease. After two more years of imprisonment, Mafra was finally brought by the Portuguese to Lisbon along with Gonzalo Gómez de Espinosa and Hans Bergen.

Upon their arrival in Portugal in 1526, Mafra and his crew members were thrown in prison. Bergen died in jail while Espinosa was later released that year. Mafra himself was detained due to his possession of important documents which included the books and papers from the Trinidad. The manuscripts included navigational notes of Andrés de San Martín, who was the fleet's chief pilot and astrologer.

These manuscripts were later transferred to Spain during the Iberian Union in 1580-1640. The letters were accessed by several Spanish chroniclers, including Antonio de Herrera y Tordesillas. These papers have been lost and now exist only in quotes, references, and citations by these historians.

=== Finally freed only to find his wife had remarried ===
After numerous pleas by Mafra to the Holy Roman Emperor, Charles V of Spain to have him released, he was freed in early 1527, and immediately proceeded to Spain. He was given an audience with the emperor after which he went straight to Palos only to discover his wife, Catalina Martínez del Mercado, believing he had died during the voyage, had remarried, and sold their personal fortunes, and land properties. Mafra wrote to the emperor complaining of his marital trouble, and asking for his intercession for the return of his possessions. The emperor agreed, and ordered an investigation be made by officials, and to have the matter resolved.

=== Expedition to the New World ===
Mafra went back to the sea in 1531 and sailed to the Americas. The governor of Guatemala, Pedro de Alvarado, in a letter written on November 20, 1536, told the emperor he had hired the services of Mafra as pilot, who was considered as one of the best sailors due to his experiences with the Magellan voyage. It's not clear where the expedition went but most scholars believe the fleet sailed to Peru.

=== Villalobos expedition (1542–1546) ===
In 1542 Mafra joined the expedition of Ruy López de Villalobos as pilot of the San Juan de Letrán, one of six ships bound for the Philippines. The galleon was separated from the fleet during a severe storm as they sailed between Eniwetok and Ulithi. While stranded in one of those islands, he wrote an account of the Magellan voyage and discussed meeting Rajah Siaiu, chieftain of Mazaua. Mafra wrote, "This same chief [Rajah Siaiu] we saw in the year 1543 by those of us in the fleet of general Ruy López de Villalobos, and he still remembered Magellan, and displayed to us some of the things he [Magellan] had given him." According to historian Antonio Pigafetta, "Magellan's gift consisted of a garment of red and yellow cloth made in the Turkish fashion, a red cap, knives, and mirrors".

Mafra and his crew members stayed on the island for about 5–6 months. There Mafra, age 53, elected to stay together with 29 other crew members. The other survivors sailed for Lisbon in a Portuguese ship. Mafra handed his manuscript to an unnamed sailor. This eventually reached Spain after having been transcribed by an unknown editor, where it remained unnoticed for many centuries in Madrid's Archive of the Indies. It was eventually discovered and published in 1920.

=== Assessment of Mafra's document ===
Mafra's document has been examined by American geographer Donald D. Brand. Brand dismissed it as nothing more than what Mafra recalled on Andrés de San Martín writings, which Mafra had with him until these were confiscated in Lisbon. "It should be pointed out here that the previously unknown, Description de los reinos, Libro que trata del descubrimiento y principio del estrecho que se llama de Magallanes, por Ginés de Mafra, published in Madrid, 1920 in Tres Relaciones could not be based on more than Mafra's memory of what he might have read in a Tratado begun by San Martín." This dismissive charge unargued, and unproved, was echoed by Martín Torodash, and Philippine religious historian John N. Schumacher, and influenced the thinking of many other scholars.

== Sources ==
English

- Bergreen, Laurence (2003). Over the Edge of the World. Harper Perennial. ISBN 0066211735.
- Defense Mapping Agency. Pub. 162 Sailing Directions (Enroute). Philippine Islands 3. Washington D.C., 1993.
- de Jesus, Vicente C. (2002). Mazaua Historiography. Retrieved February 27, 2007.
- Howgego, Raymond John, ed. (2003). "Magellan, Ferdinand 1519-1521". Encyclopedia of Exploration to 1800. Hordern House. p. 665. ISBN 1875567364.
- Joyner, Tim (1992), Magellan, Camden, Me: International Marine, ISBN 087742263X
- Morison, Samuel Eliot. The European Discovery of America, The Southern Voyages 1492-1616. Oxford University Press: New York, 1974.
- Noone, Martin J. (1986). The discovery and conquest of the Philippines: 1521 - 1581. General history of the Philippines. Manila: Historical Conservation Society. ISBN 978-971-10-2410-9.
- Schumacher, John N. "The First Mass in the Philippines". In: Kasaysayn 6: National Historical Institute: Manila, 1981.
- Schreurs, Peter (2000). "The Voyage of Fernão De Magalhães: Three Little-Known Eyewitness Accounts". Philippine Quarterly of Culture and Society. 28 (1): 90–109. ISSN 0115-0243.
- Torodash, Martin (1971-05-01). "Magellan Historiography". Hispanic American Historical Review. 51 (2): 313–335. doi:10.1215/00182168-51.2.313. ISSN 0018-2168.

Spanish

- Combés, Francisco. Historia de las islas de Mindanao, Iolo y sus adyacentes. W.E. Retana (ed.): Madrid, 1897.
- Escalante Alvarado, Garcia de. 1546. Colección de documentos inéditos relativos al descubrimiento, conquesta y organización de las Antiguas posesiones españolas en América y Oceania (42 v., Madrid, 1864-1884), tomo v, pp. 117-209.
- Herrera, Antonio de. Historia general de los hechos de los Castellanos en las islas y tierrafirme del mar oceano, t. VI. Angel Gonzalez Palencia 9ed.): Madrid, 1947.
- Mafra, Ginés de. Libro que trata del descubrimiento y principio del estrecho que se llama de Magallanes. National Library Museum; ed. by A. Blázquez and D. Aguilera: Madrid, 1920.
- Medina, José Toribio. El Descubrimiento del Océano Pacífico: Vasco Nuñez Balboa, Hernando de Magallanes y Sus Compañeros. Imprenta Universitaria: Chile, 1920.
- Ramusio, Gian Battista. "La Detta navigatione per messer Antonio Pigafetta Vicentino". In: Delle navigatione... Venice: Pp. 380-98.
- Rebelo, Gabriel. 1561. Historia das ilhas de Maluco. In: Documentação para a História das Missões do Padroado Português do Oriente: Insulíndia. Lisboã: Agencia Geral do Ultramar. 1955. Cited by José Manuel Garcia in As Filipinas na historiografía portuguesa do século XVI, Centro Portugués de Estudos do Sudeste Asiático, Porto: 2003.
- Santisteban, Fray Geronimo de. 1546. Colección de documentos inéditos relativos al descubrimiento, conquesta y organización de las Antiguas posesiones españolas en América y Oceania (42 v., Madrid, 1864-1884), tomo v., pp. 151-165.
