= Ruy López de Villalobos =

Spanish explorer of the Philippines (c. 1500–1546)

- Born: c. 1500; Málaga, Andalusia, Crown of Castile
- Died: 23 April 1546 (aged 45–46); Ambon, Moluccas, Portuguese East Indies
- Known for: Sometimes credited with naming the Philippines

Ruy López de Villalobos (Spanish pronunciation: [ruj ˈlopeθ ðe βiʝaˈloβos]; c. 1500 – 23 April 1546) was a Spanish explorer who led a failed attempt to colonize the Philippines in 1543, attempting to assert Spanish control there under the terms of the treaties of Tordesillas and Zaragoza. Unable to feed his men through barter, raiding, or farming and unable to request resupply from New Spain due to poor knowledge of the Pacific's winds and currents, Villalobos abandoned his mission and fled to the Portuguese-held Moluccas, where he died in prison. He is chiefly remembered for some sources crediting him with naming Leyte and Samar "Las Islas Filipinas" in 1543 in honor of the Spanish crown prince Philip (later King Philip II). The name was later extended across the entire Philippine Archipelago and its nation. (Other sources credit the name to one of his captains, Bernardo de la Torre.)

== Background ==
Ruy López de Villalobos was born in Málaga, Spain sometime between 1505 and 1510. He was a member of a distinguished family and his father was a close associate of the king, Ferdinand II of Aragon. He was well educated and may have studied law. At some point he became an experienced sailor and Pedro de Alvarado referred to him as "a very expert and practical gentleman in things of the sea."

== Philippine expedition ==
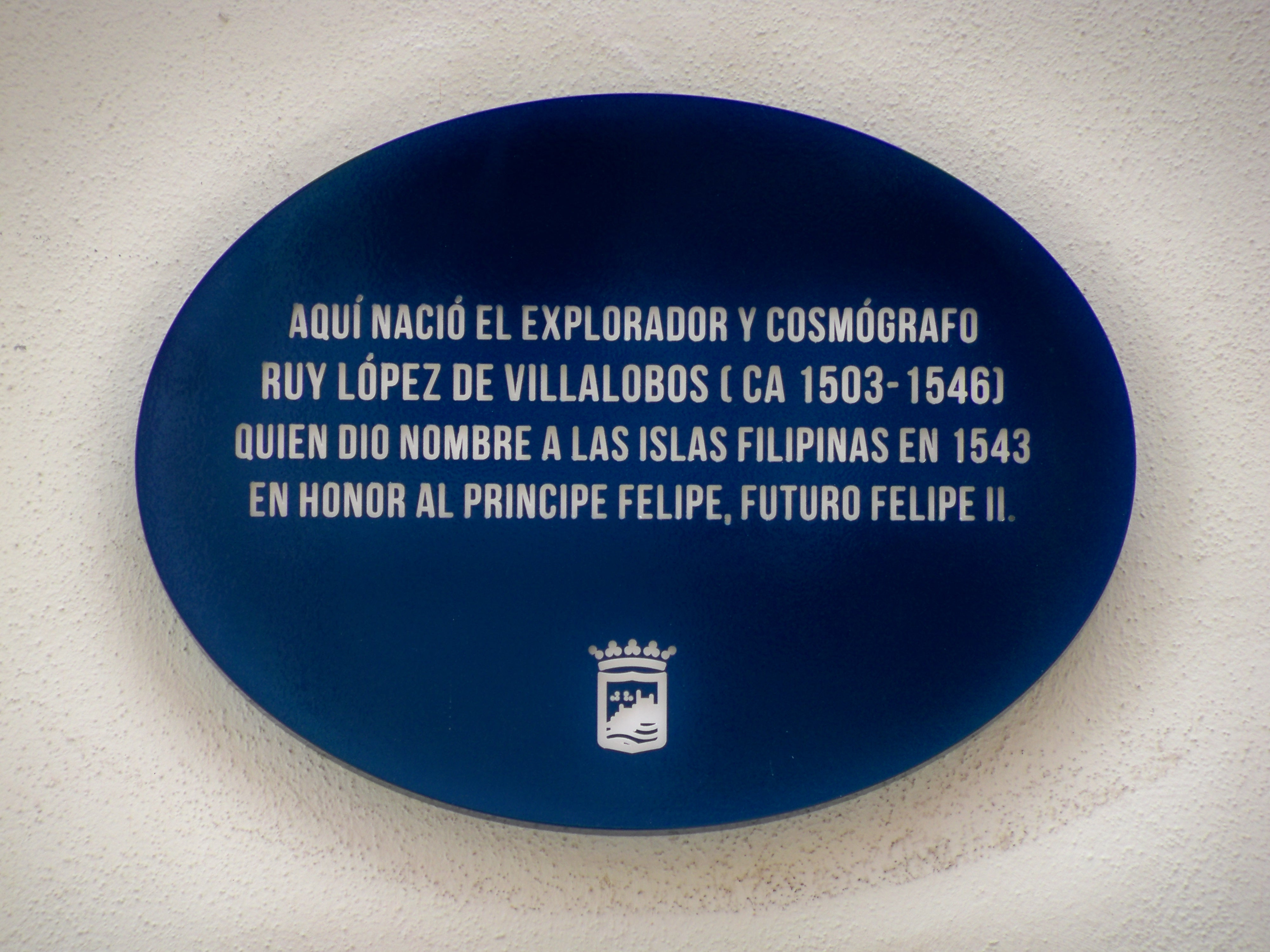
The plaque in Málaga, Spain, Villalobos's home town, commemorating his naming of the Philippines.

Villalobos was commissioned in 1541 by Antonio de Mendoza, the viceroy of New Spain and first colonial administrator in the New World, to send an expedition to the Philippines, then known to the Spanish as the "Islands of the West" (Islas del Poniente). They lay at the far western frontier of the division of the world between Spain and Portugal established by the treaties of Tordesillas and Zaragoza—in fact they lay over the line within the Portuguese area—and there was a need to establish a larger Spanish presence there as a base for trade with the Spice Islands and China. If possible, the goal was to extend Spanish control over the Moluccas in the Portuguese East Indies. Villalobos was chosen for the command because he was related to De Mendoza by marriage.

Villalobos's fleet of six ships left Barra de Navidad, Jalisco, in New Spain (now Mexico) with 370–400 men on 1 November 1542:

- His flagship (capitana) was the Santiago of 150–200 toneladas, formerly owned by Juan Rodríguez Cabrillo. He chose Gaspar Rico as the expedition's chief pilot (piloto mayor).
- The second ship—the fleet's almiranta—was the 120-tonelada galleon San Jorge, equipped with a cutwater (espolón) and under the command of Bernardo de la Torre and his pilot Alonso Fernández Tarifeño.
- The third ship of 90–100 toneladas is variously referenced as the San Anton, the San Antonio, the San Felipe, and the Siete Galigos ("Seven Greyhounds"). It was captained by Francisco Merino and piloted by Francisco Ruiz.
- The fourth ship of 70 toneladas was the San Juan de Letrán under Alonso Manrique, piloted by Ginés de Mafra, who had been a member of the 1519–1522 Magellan expedition.
- The fifth was the galley San Cristóbal under Pedro Ortíz de Rueda, piloted by Antonio Corço and powered by sails and 20 pairs of oars.
- The last was the fusta San Martín under Juan Martel, piloted by Cristóbal de Pareja and powered by sails and 14 pairs of oars. (Note: At some places in the surviving accounts, the name Santiago is also used for both the San Cristóbal and the San Martín. Similarly, the San Martín is sometimes confused with the San Cristóbal.)

The large number of passengers included a unit of soldiers and a number of gentlemen, who brought black slaves and about 40 Indian men and women as servants. Martín de Islares acted as factor and interpreter; Guido de Lavezaris, later governor of the Philippines, as treasurer; Maestre Anes ("Master Hans"), previously part of both the Magellan and Loaísa expeditions, as chief gunner; and Gerónimo de Santisteban as head of the voyage's clergy, which included 3 other Augustinian priests and 4 or 5 deacons.

The fleet first encountered the Revilla Gigedo Islands off the west coast of New Spain, among which the sighting of Roca Partida was reported for the first time. On 26 December 1542 they sighted a group of islands in the Marshalls that they called the Corals (Corales), which most probably are those of the Wotje Atoll. They thought these to be the Islands of the Kings (Los Reyes) previously charted by Álvaro de Saavedra in his 1528 expedition. They anchored at one of the islets, which they named San or Santo Esteban ("St. Stephen"). They left on 6 January 1543 and that same day they sighted several small islands on the same latitude as the Corals, which they named the Garden Islands (Los Jardines), now the Kwajalein Atoll. On 23 January 1543, the expedition found Fais in the Carolines, which they charted as the Sailors (Matelotes). (Note: Quite surprisingly for the Spaniards, upon their arrival to Fais the local people approached the ships in canoes making the sign of the cross and saying "Buenos días, matelotes!" ("Good day, sailors!") in Spanish or Portuguese, probably due to missionaries sent by António Galvão.) On 26 January 1543, they charted some new islands as the Reefs (Los Arrecifes) which have since been identified as the Yaps, also part of the Carolines.

According to Spate, Villalobos's crew included the pilot Juan Gaetan, credited by La Perouse for the discovery of Hawaii. Gaetan's voyage was described in similar terms in 1753 with the same sequence of islands and no identification of any others known by the time of the account. In 1825, the Portuguese geographer Casado Giraldes stated that the "Sandwich Islands"—i.e. the Hawaiian Islands—were discovered by Gaetan in 1542 and did not even mention James Cook.

From 6–23 January 1543, the galley San Cristóbal—now piloted by De Mafra—was separated from the other ships after a severe storm. It eventually reached the island of Mazaua, where Magellan had anchored in 1521.

Although he was attempting to reach Cebu, Villalobos ignored the advice of his pilot to lead the ships north of Mindanao. Instead, on 2 February, the fleet reached northeastern Mindanao, exposed to the weather coming from the open ocean and separated from any Chinese or Malay traders. Stuck in place, they repaired their ships after the voyage. Bernardo de la Torre or Villalobos named Mindanao Cesarea Karoli (Latin: Caesarea Caroli) in honor of the Habsburg emperor Charles V, who was also king of Spain as Carlos I. They resorted to eating grubs, unknown plants, land crabs that sickened the crew, and a phosphorescent gray lizard which killed most of those who ate it. After several days, they reached Sarangani, where they lost six men while raiding a local village for supplies. During this period, either Bernardo de la Torre or Villalobos named Leyte and Samar the Philippines (Felipinas) in honor of Charles's son the crown prince Philip (later King Philip II).

On 7 August a Portuguese ship arrived with a letter from Jorge de Castro, governor of the Moluccas. De Castro demanded an explanation for the presence of the Spaniards in Portuguese territory, in response to which Villalobos drafted a letter dated 9 August. His letter repeated the Spanish claims to the islands, saying they were within the Demarcation Line of the Crown of Castile under the relevant treaties.

On 27 August the San Juan left for New Spain under De la Torre, directed to explain the expedition's difficulties and request additional supplies and reinforcements. A second letter from De Castro arrived in the first week of September; Villalobos's reply dated 12 September repeated the same claims as before. The San Juan—having passed the Volcano Islands and possibly the Bonins without being able to replenish its water—returned in mid-October without completing its mission. (Note: Villalobos is sometimes—entirely incorrectly—credited with the discovery of Iwo Jima, the other Volcano Islands, and/or the Bonin Islands but was not part of the San Juan's voyage.) (No attempt to cross the Pacific from west to east would be successful for another two decades.) Villalobos again attempted to depart for Cebu with the San Juan and San Cristóbal, but again failed to make headway against unfavorable winds. The natives refused to provide any supplies even for sail, fearing Portuguese retribution.

De la Torre having died, the San Juan was refitted for another attempt to reach New Spain under Yñigo Ortiz de Retez using a southerly route instead. This left on 16 May 1545 and hugged the coast of New Guinea—which Ortiz de Retez named—until 12 August, when the ship was forced to turn back once again. It reached Tidore in October. Repulsed by hunger, hostile natives, and further shipwreck, Villalobos finally abandoned the remaining goals of the expedition. He and his crew members sought refuge in the Moluccas but, quarrelling with the Portuguese, were imprisoned.

Villalobos died of a tropical fever on Good Friday 23 April 1546, in his prison cell on Ambon Island. The Portuguese described him dying "of a broken heart". Popular legend made his deathbed nurse the Jesuit missionary and later saint Francis Xavier.

Some 117 of the crew survived, including De Mafra, Juan Gaetan, and Guido de Lavezaris. Juan Gaetan's account of the Villalobos voyage was published in 1550–1559 by Giovanni Battista Ramusio, an Italian historian, in his Navigations and Travels (Navigationi et Viaggi). De Mafra produced a manuscript on Magellan's voyage and had this delivered to Spain by a friend. Thirty—including De Mafra—elected to remain instead. His manuscript remained unrecognized for many centuries until being rediscovered in the early 20th century. The survivors who had left Spain or Portugal and returned home, numbering at least 20, were individually circumnavigators of the world, although the expedition itself did not accomplish that. Furthermore, there was an islander who served on this voyage and went to Spain, and years later returned to the islands, also making him a circumnavigator.

The inaccurate accounts of Villalobos and his men led Spain to believe that the Pacific was much smaller than it actually was for the rest of the 16th century.

== See also ==
- History of the Philippines (900–1565)
  - Legazpi expedition
