= Centro Nacional de Aceleradores =

Particle accelerator facility in Spain

The Centro Nacional de Aceleradores (CNA) is the centre for particle accelerators in Spain and is based in Seville. It was created in 1997.

It combines the efforts of the University of Seville, the Regional Government of Andalusia and the Spanish Higher Council for Scientific Research. It is located in the Cartuja 93 Science and Technology Park.

It has three different types of ion accelerators (3MV Van de Graaf Tandem, Cyclotron which provides 18 MeV protons and 9 MeV deuterons and a 1 MV Cockcroft-Walton Tandem as a mass spectrometer) for studies in various fields. In addition, they feature a PET/CT scanner for people, new Carbon 14 dating systems (the MiCaDaS) and a 60CO.2 irradiator.
