= Juan de Zubileta =

Sailor with Magellan

Juan de Zubileta (born 1505?) was one of the members of Ferdinand Magellan's expedition to circumnavigate the globe, which began in Seville on 10 August 1519. Said to be from Barakaldo, he was one of the 18 men who managed to complete the expedition, reaching Sanlúcar de Barrameda on 6 September 1522, on the Victoria, along with 17 other survivors.
