= Victoria (ship) =

Carrack used in Ferdinand Magellan's expeditions; first ship to circumnavigate the globe

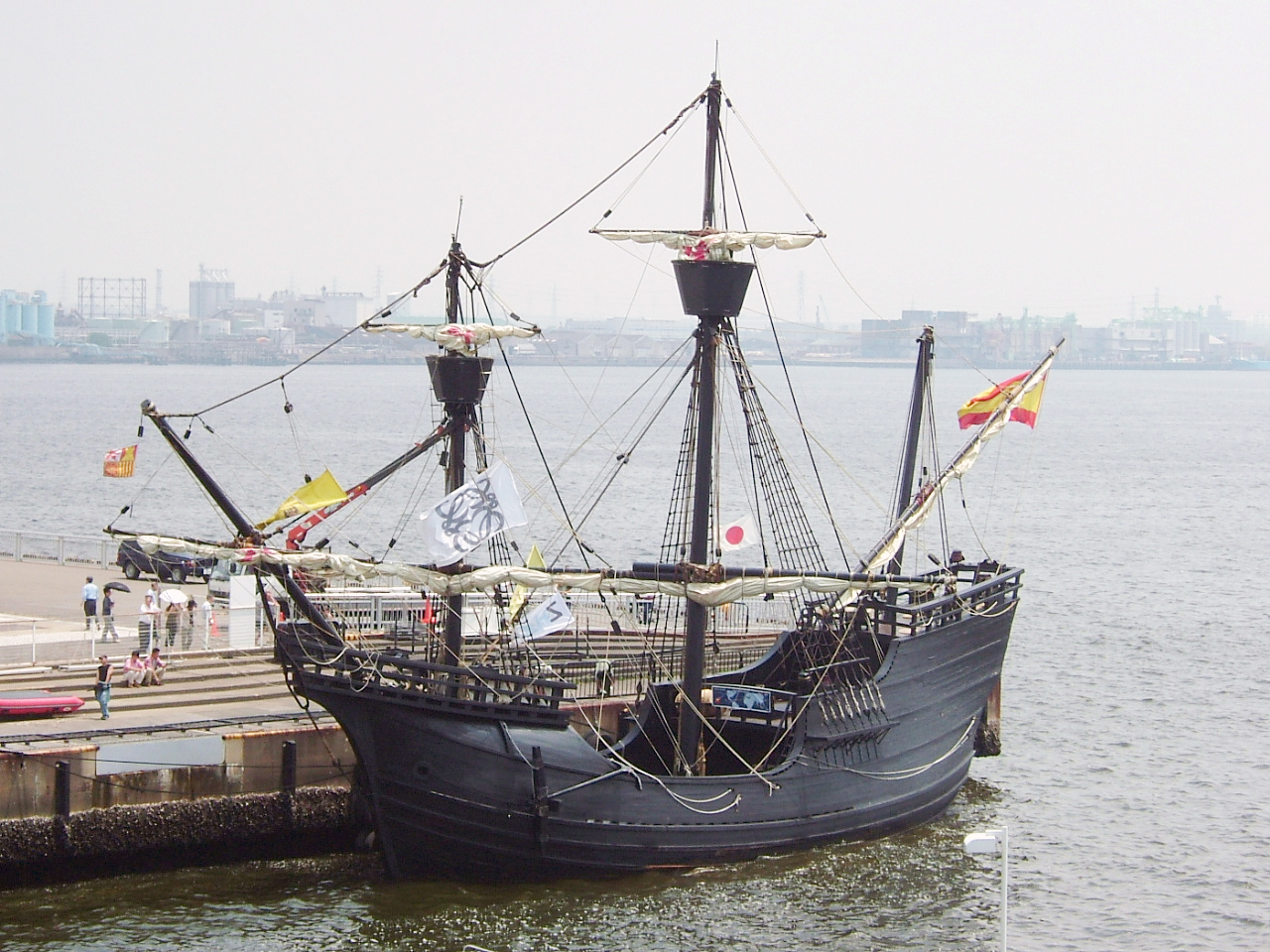
- Replica of Victoria, built in 1992, visiting Nagoya, Japan, for Expo 2005

History

Crown of Spain
- Name: Victoria
- Namesake: Santa Maria de la Victoria
- Owner: Crown of Spain
- Builder: Ondarroa
- Acquired: 1518
- Renamed: 1519
- Fate: Disappeared on a route to Seville from the Antilles, 1570
- Notes: First ship to circumnavigate the globe.

General characteristics
- Type: Carrack
- Tonnage: 85 tons
- Length: 18 m (59 ft)
- Complement: 55

Victoria or Nao Victoria (Spanish for "Victory") was a carrack famed as the first ship to successfully circumnavigate the world. Victoria was part of the Spanish expedition to the Moluccas (now Indonesia's Maluku Islands) commanded by the Portuguese explorer Ferdinand Magellan.

The carrack (Spanish: nao) was built at a Spanish shipyard in Ondarroa. Along with the four other ships, she was given to Magellan by King Charles I of Spain (later Emperor Charles V of the Holy Roman Empire). Victoria was an 85-tonel ship (Note: Note that many English sources such as Joyner provide these numbers calqued as "tons" without converting their values from the actual unit, the Biscayan tonel ("tun"). At the time of Magellan's voyage, this tonel was reckoned as 1.2 toneladas, giving the Victoria a capacity of roughly 102 toneladas, 145 m³, 5100 cu. ft., or 51 English shipping tons.) with an initial crew of about 42. The expedition's flagship and Magellan's own command was the carrack Trinidad. The other ships were the carrack San Antonio, the carrack Concepción, and the caravel Santiago.

The expedition began from Seville on 10 August 1519 with five ships and entered the ocean at Sanlúcar de Barrameda in Spain on September 20. However, only two of the ships reached their goal in the Moluccas. Thereafter, Victoria was the only ship to complete the return voyage, crossing uncharted waters of the Indian Ocean under Juan Sebastián de Elcano's command to sail around the world. She returned to Sanlúcar on 6 September 1522.

Victoria was later repaired, bought by a merchant shipper and sailed for almost another fifty years before being lost with all hands on a trip from the Antilles to Seville in about 1570.

== Etymology ==
The Victoria was named after the Minim convent of Our Lady of Victory of Triana (Spanish: Convento de Nuestra Señora de la Victoria de Triana [Convento de la Victoria (Sevilla)]) in Seville, where Magellan took his oath of allegiance to Charles I. The convent was subsequently deconsecrated during the French occupation of Spain during the Napoleonic Wars and later demolished.

== Construction ==
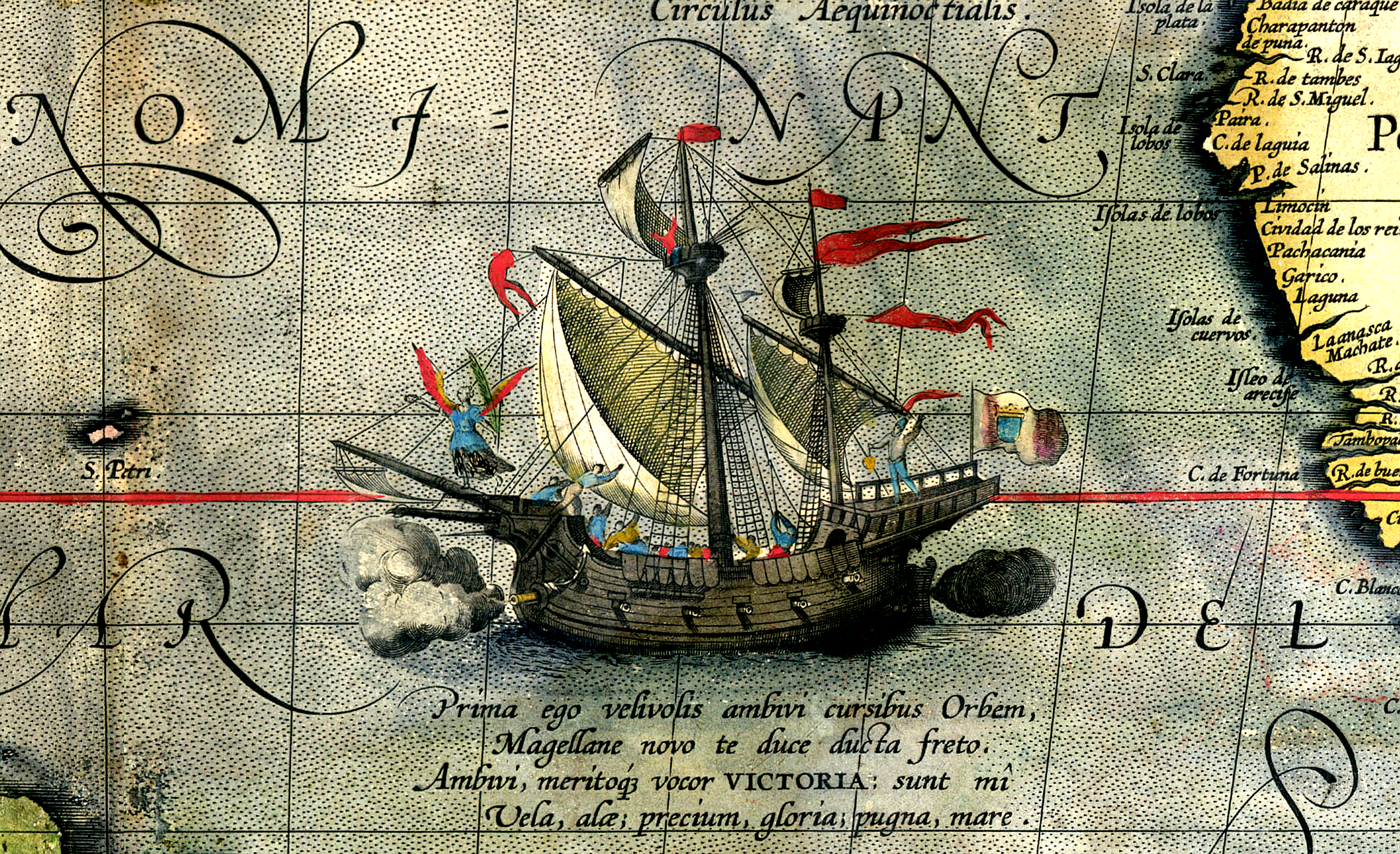
A detail from a map of 1590 showing Victoria. The legend in Latin roughly translates into English as: "I was the first to sail around the world, and it was I who guided you, Magellan, to cross the Strait. I dared, and deservedly I am called VICTORY: my sails are wings; my prize is glory; my battle, the ocean."

While agreeing on its Basque origin, for a long period the vessel was thought to have been constructed in Zarautz, next to Elcano's home town Getaria. However, research conducted by local historians has revealed that the Victoria was built at the shipyards of Ondarroa in Biscay. It was originally called Santa Maria, owned by Domingo Apallua, a ship pilot, and his son, Pedro Arismendi.

According to a notarial document dating from 1518, the ship had been used in previous years for trade between Castile and England. Royal Castilian officials bought the ship at a set price of 800 gold ducats, a figure at odds with the estimation on the ship's real value provided by the accountant of Magellan's expedition, and accepted by the owners only against their will. The ship was renamed Victoria by Magellan after the chapel he frequented on his prayers in Seville, the Santa María de la Victoria.

== Crew ==
The voyage started with a crew of about 265 men aboard five ships, however only 18 men returned alive on Victoria, while many others had deserted. Many of the men died of malnutrition. At the beginning of the voyage, Luis de Mendoza was her captain. On 2 April 1520, after establishing a settlement in Puerto San Julian in Patagonia, a fierce mutiny involving three captains broke out but was ultimately quelled. Antonio Pigafetta's and other reports state that Luis de Mendoza and Gaspar Quesada, captain of Concepcion, were executed and their remains hung on gallows on the shore.

Juan de Cartagena, captain of San Antonio, was marooned on the coast. According to Pigafetta, after Magellan's death on 27 April 1521, at the Battle of Mactan, remnants of the fleet tried to retrieve his body without success. Thereafter, Duarte Barbosa, a Portuguese man who had sided with Magellan in facing the mutiny, and João Serrão were elected leaders of the expedition. On 1 May 1521, they were invited by Rajah Humabon of Cebu to a banquet ashore to receive a gift for the king of Spain. At the banquet, most of the crew were killed or poisoned, including Duarte Barbosa and João Serrão, whom the natives wanted to exchange for Western weapons, but was left behind by the remaining crew. Pilot João Carvalho, who had survived the trap, then became the captain of Victoria. In August, near Borneo he was deposed and Juan Sebastián Elcano became captain for the remainder of the expedition.

=== Returning crew ===
Out of an initial crew of 260 people, only 18 returned to Seville with the Victoria. This was due to a scarcity in food, and a deadly outbreak of scurvy. Others had sailed back with the Santiago, which deserted near the Strait of Magellan. Yet others would return in the following months and years after having been made prisoner by the Portuguese.

They were:

Name	Rating	Nationality	Hometown
Juan Sebastián Elcano	Master	Basque	Getaria
Francisco Albo	Pilot	Greek	Chios
Miguel de Rodas	Pilot	Greek	Rhodes
Juan de Acurio	Pilot	Basque	Bermeo
Antonio Pigafetta	Supernumerary	Venetian	Vicenza
Martín de Judicibus	Chief Steward	Genoese	Genoa
Hernando de Bustamante	Barber surgeon	Castilian	Alcántara
Nicholas the Greek	Mariner	Greek	Nafplion
Miguel Sánchez	Mariner	Greek	Rhodes
Antonio Hernández Colmenero	Mariner	Andalusian	Ayamonte
Francisco Rodrigues	Mariner	Portuguese	Seville
Juan Rodríguez	Mariner	Castilian	Huelva
Diego Carmena	Mariner	Galician	Baiona
Hans of Aachen	Gunner	German	Aachen
Juan de Arratia	Able Seaman	Basque	Bilbao
Vasco Gómez Gallego	Able Seaman	Galician	Baiona
Juan de Santandrés	Apprentice Seaman	Castilian	Cueto
Juan de Zubileta	Page	Basque	Barakaldo

Three of these survivors left written records. Elcano wrote a letter to the Emperor on the very day of his return with a brief summary of the trip, and provided additional information to authors such as Maximilianus Transylvanus. Francisco Albo kept a log book with the ship's positional data for every day of sailing. Antonio Pigafetta wrote a detailed first-person account of the voyage. His work, which he began compiling in 1522, was partially published in France around 1525 under the title "Le voyage et nauigation".

== Voyage ==
The long circumnavigation began in Seville in 1519 and returned to Sanlúcar de Barrameda on 6 September 1522, after sailing 68,000 kilometres (42,000 mi), 35,000 kilometres (22,000 mi) of which was largely unknown to the crew. On 21 December 1521, Victoria sailed on from Tidore in Indonesia alone because the other ships left the convoy due to lack of rations. The ship was in terrible shape, with her sails torn and only kept afloat by continuous pumping of water. Victoria managed to return to Spain with a shipload of spices, the value of which was greater than the cost of the entire original fleet.

Victoria was later repaired, bought by a merchant shipper and sailed for almost another fifty years before being lost with all hands on a trip from the Antilles to Seville about 1570.

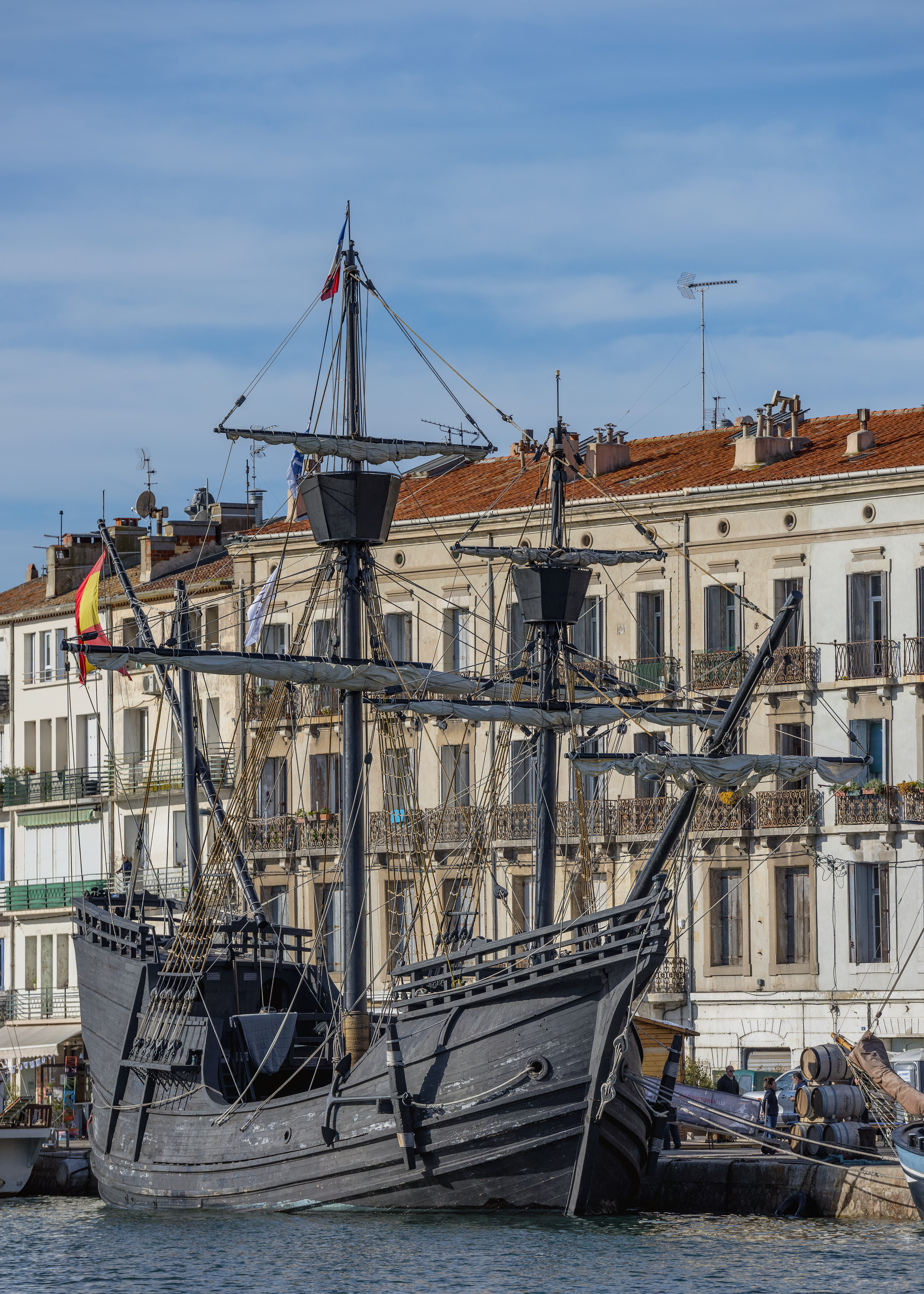
1992 replica of Nao Victoria during "Escale à Sète 2016" in Sète, Hérault, France

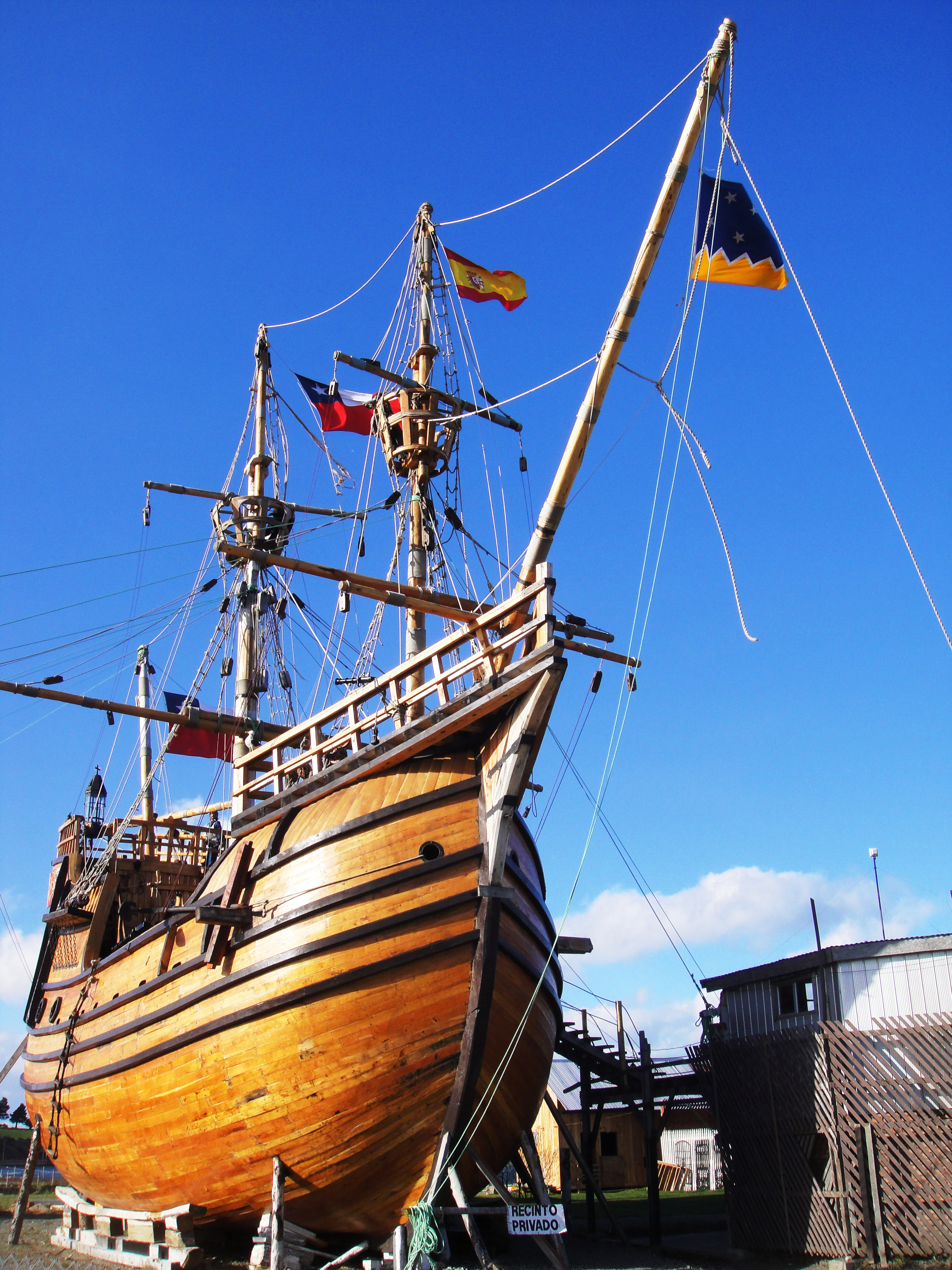
2011 replica of Nao Victoria built in Punta Arenas, Chile

== Legacy ==
The Victoria was depicted in many sixteenth-century maps such as the Salviati planisphere or Abraham Orterlius's map of the Pacific Ocean.

A vignette of the Victoria forms the logo of the Hakluyt Society, a London-based text publication society founded in 1846, which publishes scholarly editions of primary records of historic voyages, travels and other geographical material. The logo appears on the cover of all the Society's published volumes.

=== Replicas ===
A replica of the ship was built in 1992 for the Universal Exposition of that year in Seville. It is now operated by the Fundación Nao Victoria. Between 2004 and 2006, this replica repeated the journey of the original Nao Victoria, "though taking a slightly different route". It has continued to be maintained in seaworthy condition.

To commemorate the five hundredth anniversary of the first circumnavigation, the Fundación Nao Victoria, commissioned another replica of the nao from the Palmas de Punta Umbría shipyards. It was launched on February 11, 2020, with the destination of becoming a permanent exhibition next to the Torre del Oro. The replica arrived in Seville on March 9, 2020.

In 2006, to celebrate the bicentennial of Chile, an entrepreneur from Punta Arenas founded a project to build a replica of the ship. The search for the original plans of Nao Victoria took longer than expected and the project was delayed from 2006 to 2009. The replica was completed by 2011.
