= San Julian Bay =

Argentinian bay

Coordinates: 49°20′S 67°45′W

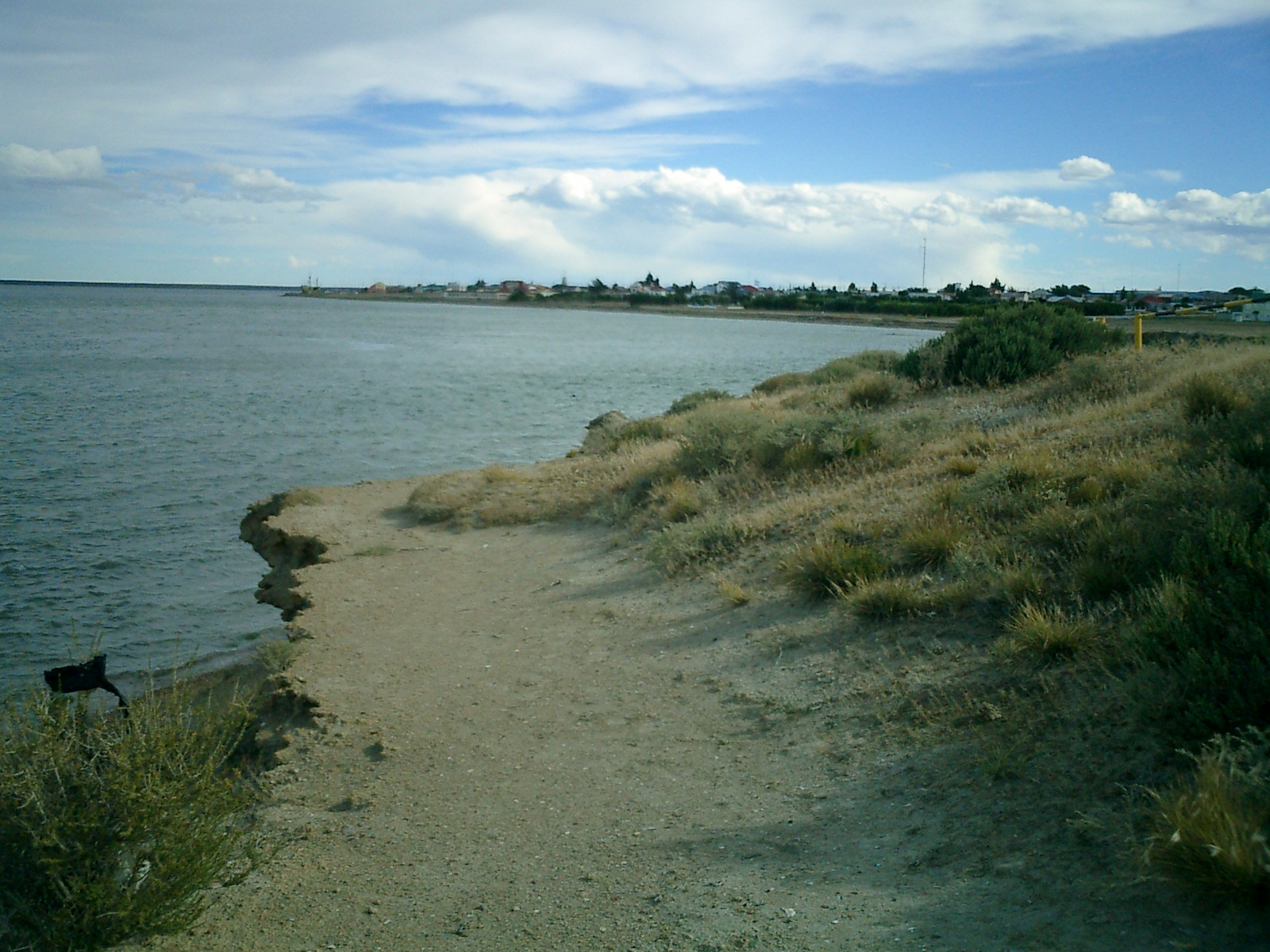
San Julian Bay, January 2006

San Julian Bay is a curved bay, located next to the city of San Julián in Santa Cruz Province, Argentina. The bay is located in Patagonia. On the eastern side of the bay, approximately 25 kilometers from the city is the Natural Reserve of San Julián Peninsula. It contains 10,000 hectares of land and water. In the reserve you can see steppe, rhea, red and grey fox, Commerson's dolphins, Magellanic penguins and many more species of marine life as well.

Magellan spent a few months here during his voyage.
