= Tonelada =

Conventional Spanish and Portuguese unit

The tonelada (Spanish and Portuguese for "a tunful") (Note: The tonelada should not be confused with the tonel (Spanish and Portuguese for "a tun"), which was a separate unit with different values. At the time of the Magellan Expedition (1519–1522), the Biscayan tonel was reckoned as 1.2 toneladas, about 1.7 m^{3} or 60.1 cu. ft.) was a conventional Spanish and Portuguese unit of mass, volume, and capacity roughly equivalent to the English "ton" in its various senses. In English following Spain and Portugal's adoption of the metric system, the toneladas are most often used to specify the capacity of Spanish and Portuguese ships during the Age of Exploration with greater care than simply using the misleadingly vague calque "ton". However, as with the ton, the specific size of the units varied with time and location.

== Spanish unit ==
The Spanish tonelada of volume was reckoned as 2 butts or pipes (botas or pipas) and equivalent to 968.2 liters or 255.8 gallons.

The Spanish tonelada of shipping capacity varied in size and method of computation over the years but scholars place the usual value for southern Spain from Columbus through the Age of Exploration at about 1.42 m^{3} or 50.1 cu. ft. (Note: The French scholar Pierre Chaunu argued for a tonelada that varied directly with changes in Portuguese and Spanish weights over time, but this was persuasively refuted by Michel Morineau in 1966.) This was the same as the "sea ton" (French: tonneau de mer) used in early modern Bordeaux, France, and roughly half of the English old measure and British gross register tons. (The present system of tonnage varies logarithmically with ship size and cannot be linearly converted.) At other times, it was closer to 2/3 of the British shipping ton.

The Spanish tonelada of mass was normally reckoned as 20 quintals or 2000 Spanish pounds (libras). The Castilian Spanish pound was standardized as about 460 grams by the 19th century, producing a tonelada of around 920 kilograms or 2030 pounds avoirdupois. In Mexico, the tonelada was instead reckoned as 2240 Castilian pounds, 1030.4 kg or 2266.9 lbs., while Valencia used only 1920 slightly heavier pounds—about 534 grams—so that it was equivalent to 1025.3 kg or 2255.7 lbs.

== Portuguese unit ==
The Portuguese tonelada of volume was initially reckoned as 2 pipes (pipas), which in the 19th century was equivalent to 860.3 liters or 226.3 gallons. Following metrification, Portugal's tonelada de junta used a quasimetric tonelada of exactly 800 liters while Brazil used a kiloliter tonelada of exactly 1000 liters.

The Portuguese tonelada of mass was reckoned as 1728 arratels in Europe and Rio de Janeiro but 2240 arratels in Pernambuco. The arratel was standardized in Portugal and Brazil as about 460 grams by the 19th century, producing a lighter tonelada of around 793.2 kilograms or 1748.5 pounds avoirdupois and a heavier one around 1028.2 kg and 2266.7 lbs.

== See also ==
- Metric ton (Portuguese & Spanish: tonelada métrica or simply tonelada)
- English tons (Portuguese & Spanish: tonelada inglesa, tonelada americana, or simply tonelada)
