= 1592 =

1592 in various calendars
- Gregorian calendar: 1592; MDXCII
- Ab urbe condita: 2345
- Armenian calendar: 1041; ԹՎ ՌԽԱ
- Assyrian calendar: 6342
- Balinese saka calendar: 1513–1514
- Bengali calendar: 998–999
- Berber calendar: 2542
- English Regnal year: 34 Eliz. 1 – 35 Eliz. 1
- Buddhist calendar: 2136
- Burmese calendar: 954
- Byzantine calendar: 7100–7101
- Chinese calendar: 辛卯年 (Metal Rabbit); 4289 or 4082 — to — 壬辰年 (Water Dragon); 4290 or 4083
- Coptic calendar: 1308–1309
- Discordian calendar: 2758
- Ethiopian calendar: 1584–1585
- Hebrew calendar: 5352–5353
- Hindu calendars
- Vikram Samvat: 1648–1649
- Shaka Samvat: 1513–1514
- Kali Yuga: 4692–4693
- Holocene calendar: 11592
- Igbo calendar: 592–593
- Iranian calendar: 970–971
- Islamic calendar: 1000–1001
- Japanese calendar: Tenshō 20 / Bunroku 1 (文禄元年)
- Javanese calendar: 1512–1513
- Julian calendar: Gregorian minus 10 days
- Korean calendar: 3925
- Minguo calendar: 320 before ROC 民前320年
- Nanakshahi calendar: 124
- Thai solar calendar: 2134–2135
- Tibetan calendar: ལྕགས་མོ་ཡོས་ལོ་ (female Iron-Hare); 1718 or 1337 or 565 — to — ཆུ་ཕོ་འབྲུག་ལོ་ (male Water-Dragon); 1719 or 1338 or 566

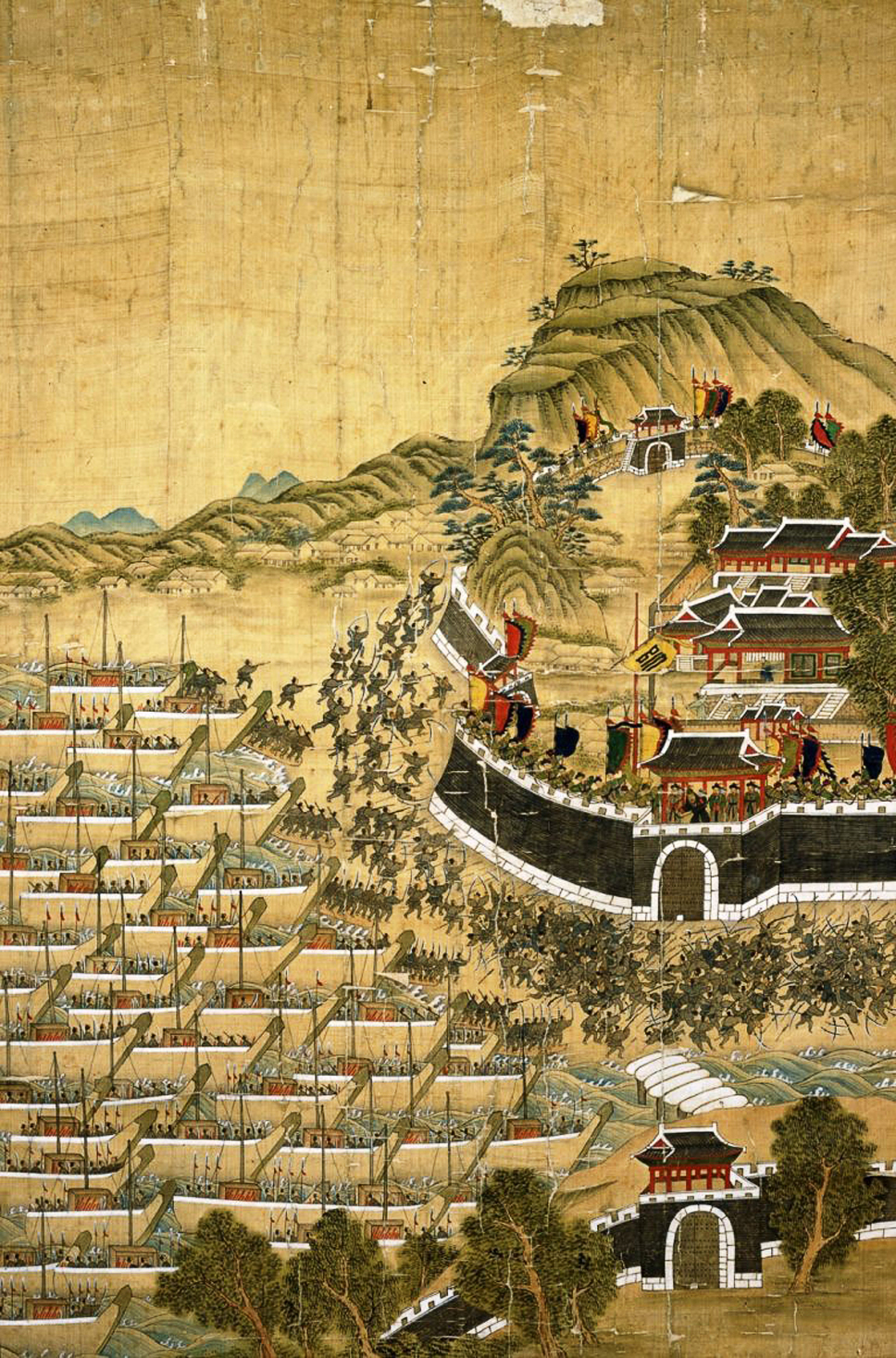
May 24–May 25: Siege of Busanjin

1592 (MDXCII) was a leap year starting on Wednesday of the Gregorian calendar and a leap year starting on Saturday of the Julian calendar, the 1592nd year of the Common Era (CE) and Anno Domini (AD) designations, the 592nd year of the 2nd millennium, the 92nd year of the 16th century, and the 3rd year of the 1590s decade. As of the start of 1592, the Gregorian calendar was 10 days ahead of the Julian calendar, which remained in localized use until 1923.

== Events ==
=== January–March ===
- January 29 – Cardinal Ippolito Aldobrandini of San Pancrazio is elected as the new Pontiff of the Roman Catholic Church after Ludovico Madruzzo and Giulio Antonio Santori withdraw following 19 rounds of voting by the 54 cardinals present. Cardinal Santori had received 28 votes on the first ballot, eight short of the necessary two-thirds majority required, and fewer on the rounds that followed. Aldobrandini is crowned the next day as Pope Clement VIII, the 231st pope. Clement succeeds Pope Innocent IX, who died on December 30, 1591. He immediately recalls the Sixtine Vulgate.
- February 7 – George Gordon, 1st Marquess of Huntly, sets fire to Donibristle Castle in Scotland and murders James Stewart, 2nd Earl of Moray.
- March 3 – Trinity College Dublin, Ireland's oldest university, is founded.
- March 14 – Ultimate Pi Day: the largest correspondence between calendar dates and significant digits of pi since the introduction of the Julian calendar according to the American method of writing the number of the month prior to the day.

=== April–June ===
- April 4 – The future Henry IV of France, King designate of Henry III of France, announces in a declaration, so-called "Expedient," his intention to take instruction in, and convert to, the Catholic religion.
- April 13 – The Japanese invasions of Korea (1592–98) begin with the Siege of Busanjin.
- April 20 – King Henry IV of France ends the siege of Rouen, the Spanish-held capital of Normandy, five months after its November 11 commencement, as the Spanish Navy arrives to relieve the city.
- April 24 – Battle of Sangju: The Japanese are victorious over the Koreans fighting for the Kingdom of Joseon.
- April 28 – Battle of Ch'ungju: Japan inflicts a decisive defeat on Korea.
- May 7
  - The Malta plague epidemic begins when galleys from the Grand Duchy of Tuscany arrive on the island with 100 prisoners of war from Egypt, and 20 ill crewmembers; over the next 18 months, 3,000 people on Malta die of the bubonic plague.
  - Battle of Okpo: The Korean navy is victorious over Japan.
- May 20 –August 19 – Battle of Flores (Anglo-Spanish War (1585–1604)), a series of naval engagements in the Azores in which the English are victorious, taking the great Portuguese carrack Madre de Deus on or about August 3.
- May 29 – Battle of Sacheon: Korean admiral Yi Sun-sin destroys all 13 Japanese ships taking part, using his improved turtle ship for the first time in battle.
- June 2 – Battle of Dangpo:The Korean navy is again victorious over Japan.
- June 10 – The Siege of Bihać begins in the Kingdom of Croatia, by Telli Hasan Pasha (Hasan Predojević) of the Ottoman Empire. Bihać is captured on June 19 and is lost for Croatia forever.

=== July–September ===
- July 20 – The Japanese capture the Korean capital Hanyang, causing Seonjo to request the assistance of Ming dynasty Chinese forces, who recapture the city a year later.
- July 30 – Alonso de Sotomayor petitions the viceroy of Peru for more troops to help resist attacks by Indians and English pirates.
- August – 1592–1593 London plague breaks out in England.
- August 9 – English explorer John Davis, commander of the Desire, probably discovers the Falkland Islands.
- August 14 – Battle of Hansan Island: The Korean navy defeats the Japanese.
- September 1 – Battle of Busan: The Korean fleet makes a surprise attack on the Japanese but fails to break their supply lines to Busan.
- September 7 – The captured Madre de Deus enters Dartmouth harbour in England and is then subjected to mass theft.

=== October–December ===
- October 5 – Siege of Jinju: The Korean navy is victorious over the Japanese.
- November 3 – The city of San Luis Potosí is founded.
- November 4 (2nd waxing of Natdaw, 954 ME) – In a war between what are now the nations of Myanmar and Thailand, the Army of Burma, led by King Nanda Bayin Burma (Toungoo) begins its invasion of the Ayutthaya Kingdom (Siam), defended by King Naresuan.
- November 9 – The Sixto-Clementine Vulgate, an updated edition of the Latin language translation of the Bible, is promulgated by the Roman Catholic Church.
- November 12 – The Collegium Melitense is founded in Malta by Bishop Garagallo.
- November 17 – Sigismund III Vasa becomes the new King of Sweden upon the death of his father, King John III.
- December 4 – Yu Sŏngnyong becomes the new Yeonguijeong (Chief State Councillor of the government of the Korean Empire, similar to Prime Minister) and serves until 1598.
- December 21 – The city of London begins publishing the Bill of Mortality, the first regular data of deaths from an epidemic, as the government reports its weekly survey of the number of burials in the 113 parishes of London of deaths from bubonic plague. The death statistics continue to be published until December 18, 1595.

=== Date unknown ===
- The German Duchy Palatine Zweibrücken becomes the first territory in the world with compulsory education for girls and boys.
- William Cecil, 1st Baron Burghley, chief adviser of Queen Elizabeth I of England, is taken seriously ill.
- Negotiations begin for the annulment of the childless marriage of Henry IV of France and Marguerite of Valois.
- The Confucian shrine of Munmyo in Korea is destroyed by fire.
- The Population Census Edict is promulgated in Japan by Toyotomi Hidetsugu.
- Henry Constable's Diana, one of the first sonnet sequences in English, is published in London.

== Births ==
=== January–June ===
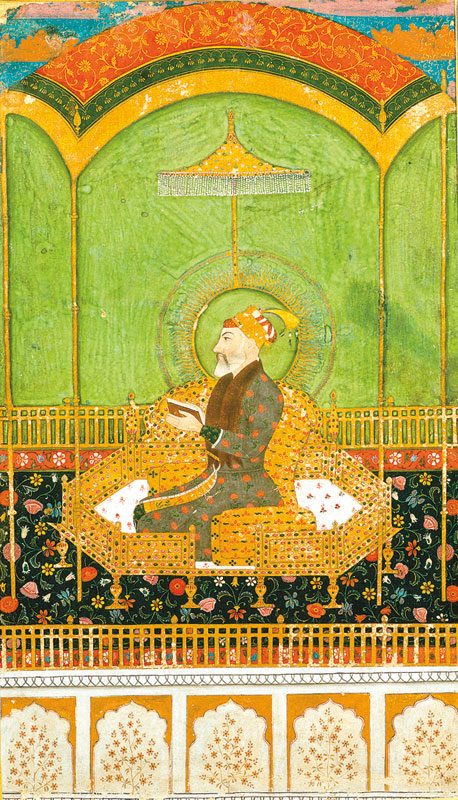
Emperor Shah Jahan born on January 15

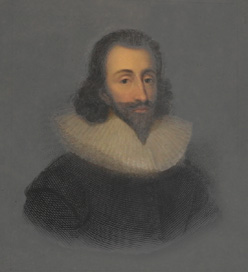
Sir John Eliot born on April 11

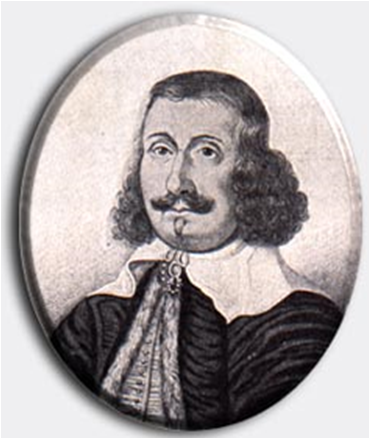
Francis Quarles born on May 8

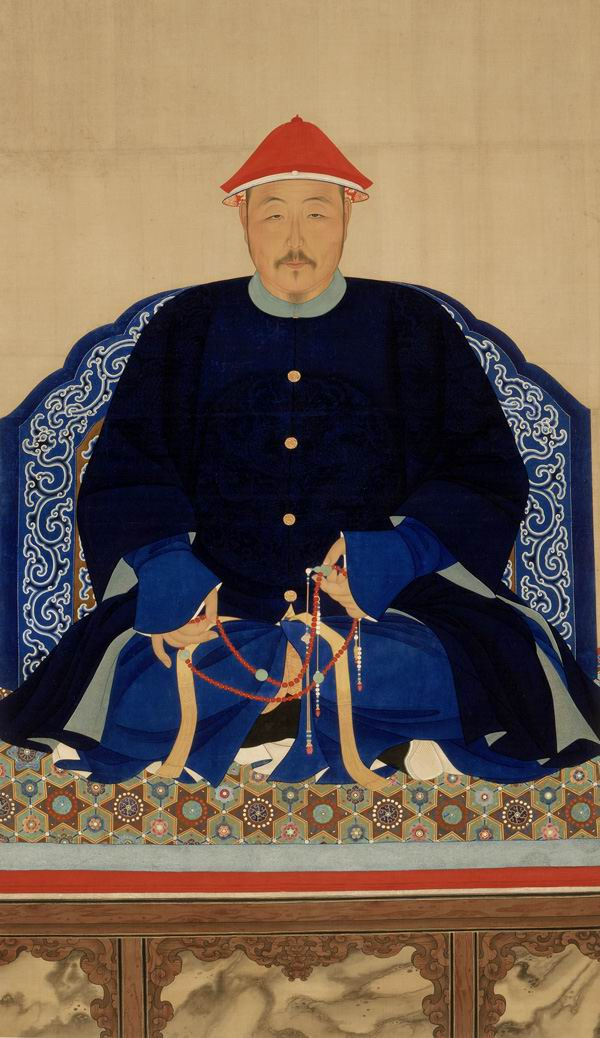
Emperor Hong Taiji born on November 28

- January 5 – Shah Jahan, 5th Mughal Emperor of India from 1628 to 1658 (d. 1666)
- January 22
  - Philippe Alegambe, Belgian Jesuit priest and bibliographer (d. 1652)
  - Pierre Gassendi, French philosopher and scientist (d. 1655)
- February 5 – Vincenzo della Greca, Italian architect (d. 1661)
- February 22 – Nicholas Ferrar, English trader (d. 1637)
- February 23 – Balthazar Gerbier, Dutch painter (d. 1663)
- March 20 – Giovanni da San Giovanni, Italian painter (d. 1636)
- March 28 – Comenius, Czech teacher and writer (d. 1670)
- April 4 – Abraham Elzevir, Dutch printer (d. 1652)
- April 9 – Jiří Třanovský, Czech priest and musician (d. 1637)
- April 11 – John Eliot, Member of Parliament, Statesman, Vice-Admiral of Devon (d. 1632)
- April 15 – Francesco Maria Brancaccio, Catholic cardinal (d. 1675)
- April 22 – Wilhelm Schickard, German inventor (d. 1635)
- April 24
  - Marcos Ramírez de Prado y Ovando, Roman Catholic prelate who served as Archbishop of Mexico (d. 1667)
  - Sir John Trelawny, 1st Baronet, British baronet (d. 1664)
- May 8 – Francis Quarles, English poet most famous for his Emblem book aptly entitled Emblems (d. 1644)
- May 14 – Alice Barnham, wife of English scientific philosopher and statesman Francis Bacon (d. 1650)
- June 7 – Balthasar Cordier, Belgian Jesuit exegete, editor (d. 1650)
- June 9 – Jean de Brisacier, French Jesuit (d. 1668)
- June 13
  - Sophia Hedwig of Brunswick-Lüneburg, German noblewoman (d. 1642)
  - Tobias Michael, German composer and cantor (d. 1657)

=== July–December ===
- July 10 – Pierre d'Hozier, French historian (d. 1660)
- July 20 – Johan Björnsson Printz, governor of New Sweden (d. 1663)
- August 1 – François le Métel de Boisrobert, French poet (d. 1662)
- August 7 – Arnauld de Oihenart, Basque historian and poet (d. 1668)
- August 11 – Carlo de Tocco, Italian nobleman (d. 1674)
- August 13 – William, Count of Nassau-Siegen, German count (d. 1642)
- August 16 – Wybrand de Geest, Dutch painter (d. 1661)
- August 28 – George Villiers, 1st Duke of Buckingham, English statesman (d. 1628)
- August 29 – Sir Benjamin Ayloffe, 2nd Baronet, English politician (d. 1662)
- September 1 – Maria Angela Astorch, Spanish mystic and saint (d. 1665)
- September 5 – Jacopo Vignali, Italian painter (d. 1664)
- September 15 – Giovanni Battista Rinuccini, archbishop of Fermo (d. 1653)
- September 18 – Jean Guyon, French colonist (d. 1663)
- September 20 – Nicholas Stoughton, English politician (d. 1648)
- September 21 – Nathaniel Foote, American colonist (d. 1644)
- September 24 – Christopher Wandesford, English administrator and politician (d. 1640)
- September 25 – Herman Krefting, Norwegian businessman (d. 1651)
- October 7 – Henry Wenceslaus, Duke of Oels-Bernstadt, Duke of Bernstadt (1617 – 1639) (d. 1639)
- October 13 – Christian Gueintz, German teacher and writer-grammarian (d. 1650)
- October 22 – Gustav Horn, Count of Pori, Swedish/Finnish soldier and politician (d. 1657)
- October 30 – Giulio Benso, Italian painter (d. 1668)
- November 4
  - Gerard van Honthorst, Dutch painter (d. 1656)
  - Albrecht von Kalckstein, German noble (d. 1667)
- November 5 – Charles Chauncy, English-born president of Harvard College (d. 1671)
- November 13 – Antonio Grassi, Italian priest (d. 1671)
- November 28 – Hong Taiji, Emperor of China (d. 1643)
- December 5 – Thomas Bennet, successful civil lawyer (d. 1670)
- December 6 – William Cavendish, 1st Duke of Newcastle (d. 1676)
- December 9 – Krzysztof Arciszewski, Polish-Lithuanian noble (d. 1656)
- December 29 – Johannes Matthiae Gothus, Swedish academic (d. 1670)

=== Date unknown ===
- Catalina de Erauso, Spanish-Mexican nun and soldier (d. 1650)
- Richard Bellingham, American colonial magistrate (d. 1672)
- John Hacket, English churchman (d. 1670)
- Angélique Paulet, French salonnière, singer, musician and actress (d. 1651)
- Ingen, Chinese Zen Buddhist poet, calligrapher (d. 1673)
- John Jenkins, English composer (d. 1678)
- John Oldham, early English settler in Massachusetts (d. 1636)
- Walatta Petros, saint in the Ethiopian Orthodox Tewahedo Church (d. 1642)
- Sara Copia Sullam, Italian poet and writer (d. 1641)

=== Probable ===
- Étienne Brûlé, French explorer in Canada (d. 1632)

== Deaths ==
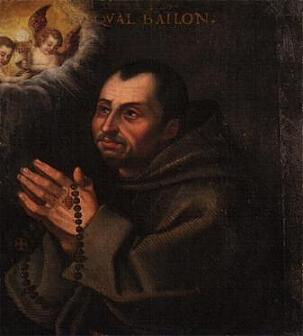
Saint Paschal Baylon died on May 17, 1592

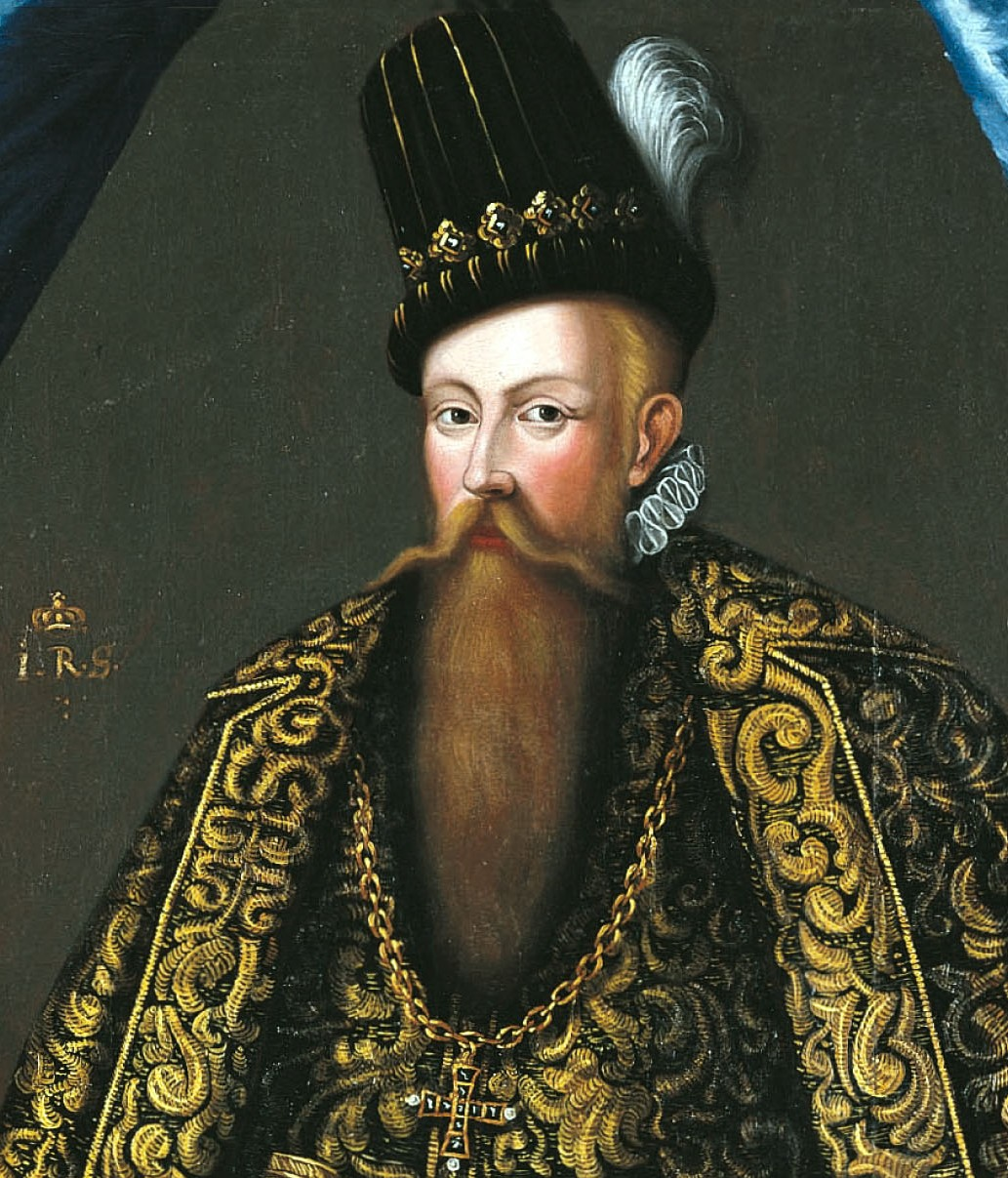
King John III of Sweden died on November 17, 1592

- January 5 – William, Duke of Jülich-Cleves-Berg, German nobleman (b. 1516)
- January 22 – Elisabeth of Austria, Queen of France (b. 1554)
- January 27 – Gian Paolo Lomazzo, Italian painter (b. 1538)
- February 2 – Ana de Mendoza y de Silva, Princess of Éboli, Spanish noble (b. 1540)
- February 29 – Alessandro Striggio, Italian composer (b. 1540)
- March 4 – Christopher, Duke of Mecklenburg and administrator of Ratzeburg (b. 1537)
- March 5 – Michiel Coxie, Flemish painter (b. 1499)
- March 22 – John VII, Duke of Mecklenburg-Schwerin (1576–1592) (b. 1558)
- April 8 – Dorothea Susanne of Simmern, Duchess of Saxe-Weimar (b. 1544)
- April 13 – Bartolomeo Ammannati, Italian architect and sculptor (b. 1511)
- April 18 – George John I, Count Palatine of Veldenz (b. 1543)
- April 21 – Christoph, Count of Hohenzollern-Haigerloch (b. 1552)
- May 17 – Paschal Baylon, Spanish mystic and saint (b. 1540)
- May 24 – Nikolaus Selnecker, German musician (b. 1530)
- June 17 – Ernst Ludwig, Duke of Pomerania (b. 1545)
- July 1 – Marc'Antonio Ingegneri, Italian composer (b. c. 1547)
- July 4 – Francesco Bassano the Younger, Italian painter (b. 1559)
- July 6 – John George of Ohlau, Duke of Oława and Wołów (1586–1592) (b. 1552)
- July 18 – Sibylle of Saxony, Duchess of Saxe-Lauenburg (b. 1515)
- July 22 – Ludwig Rabus, German martyrologist (b. 1523)
- July 26 – Armand de Gontaut, Baron of Biron, French soldier (b. 1524)
- August 20 – William the Younger, Duke of Brunswick-Lüneburg (b. 1535)
- August 25
  - William IV, Landgrave of Hesse-Kassel (or Hesse-Cassel) (b. 1532)
  - Shimazu Toshihisa, Japanese samurai (b. 1537)
- September 3 – Robert Greene, English writer (b. 1558)
- September 13 – Michel de Montaigne, French essayist (b. 1533)
- September 20 – Francisco Vallés, Spanish physician (b. 1524)
- October 15 – Jean Vendeville, law professor, Roman Catholic bishop (b. 1527)
- October 19 – Anthony Browne, 1st Viscount Montagu, English politician (b. 1528)
- October 28 – Ogier Ghiselin de Busbecq, Flemish diplomat (b. 1522)
- November 17 – King John III of Sweden (b. 1537)
- November 27 – Nakagawa Hidemasa, Japanese military commander (b. 1568)
- December 3 – Alexander Farnese, Duke of Parma (b. 1545)
- Date unknown
  - Moderata Fonte, Italian poet, writer and philosopher (b. 1555)
  - Pedro Sarmiento de Gamboa, Spanish explorer (b. 1532)
  - Katharina Gerlachin, German printer (b. 1520)
  - Girolamo Muziano, Italian painter (b. 1532)
