= 1642 =

1642 in various calendars
- Gregorian calendar: 1642; MDCXLII
- Ab urbe condita: 2395
- Armenian calendar: 1091; ԹՎ ՌՂԱ
- Assyrian calendar: 6392
- Balinese saka calendar: 1563–1564
- Bengali calendar: 1048–1049
- Berber calendar: 2592
- English Regnal year: 17 Cha. 1 – 18 Cha. 1
- Buddhist calendar: 2186
- Burmese calendar: 1004
- Byzantine calendar: 7150–7151
- Chinese calendar: 辛巳年 (Metal Snake); 4339 or 4132 — to — 壬午年 (Water Horse); 4340 or 4133
- Coptic calendar: 1358–1359
- Discordian calendar: 2808
- Ethiopian calendar: 1634–1635
- Hebrew calendar: 5402–5403
- Hindu calendars
- Vikram Samvat: 1698–1699
- Shaka Samvat: 1563–1564
- Kali Yuga: 4742–4743
- Holocene calendar: 11642
- Igbo calendar: 642–643
- Iranian calendar: 1020–1021
- Islamic calendar: 1051–1052
- Japanese calendar: Kan'ei 19 (寛永１９年)
- Javanese calendar: 1563–1564
- Julian calendar: Gregorian minus 10 days
- Korean calendar: 3975
- Minguo calendar: 270 before ROC 民前270年
- Nanakshahi calendar: 174
- Thai solar calendar: 2184–2185
- Tibetan calendar: ལྕགས་མོ་སྦྲུལ་ལོ་ (female Iron-Snake); 1768 or 1387 or 615 — to — ཆུ་ཕོ་རྟ་ལོ་ (male Water-Horse); 1769 or 1388 or 616

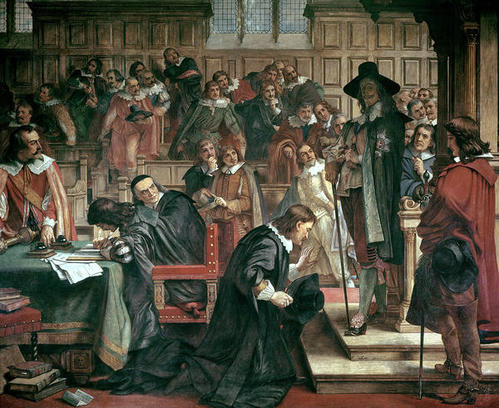
January 4: King Charles I of England attempts to have Five Members of Parliament arrested.

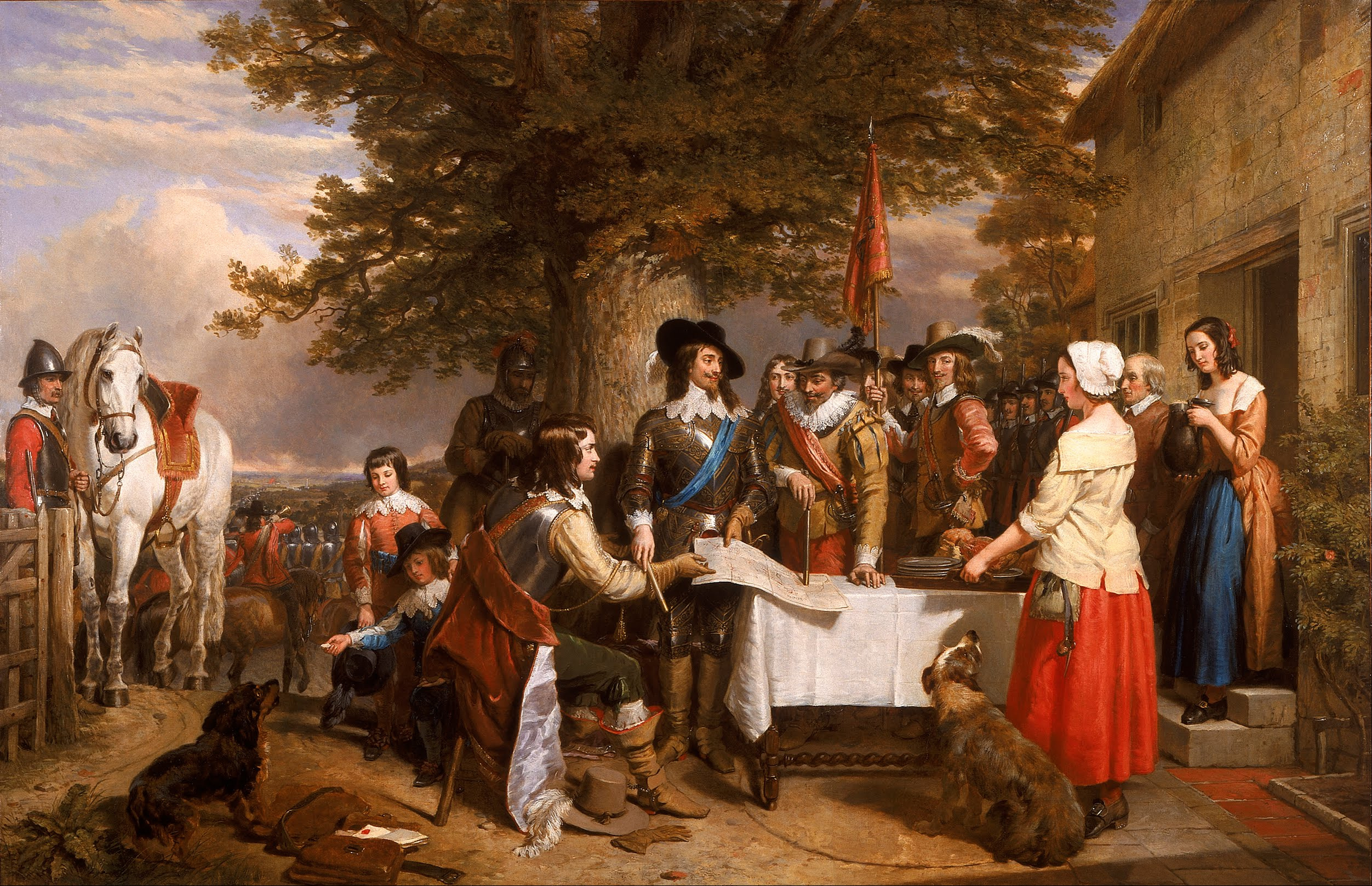
October 23: Battle of Edgehill.

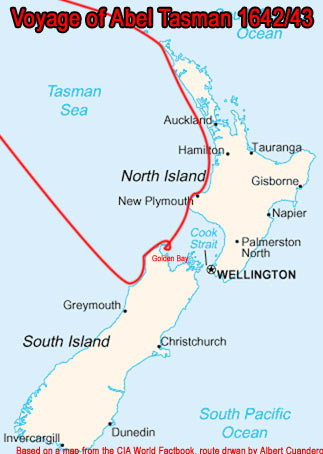
December 13: Abel Tasman sights New Zealand.

1642 (MDCXLII) was a common year starting on Wednesday of the Gregorian calendar and a common year starting on Saturday of the Julian calendar, the 1642nd year of the Common Era (CE) and Anno Domini (AD) designations, the 642nd year of the 2nd millennium, the 42nd year of the 17th century, and the 3rd year of the 1640s decade. As of the start of 1642, the Gregorian calendar was 10 days ahead of the Julian calendar, which remained in localized use until 1923.

== Events ==
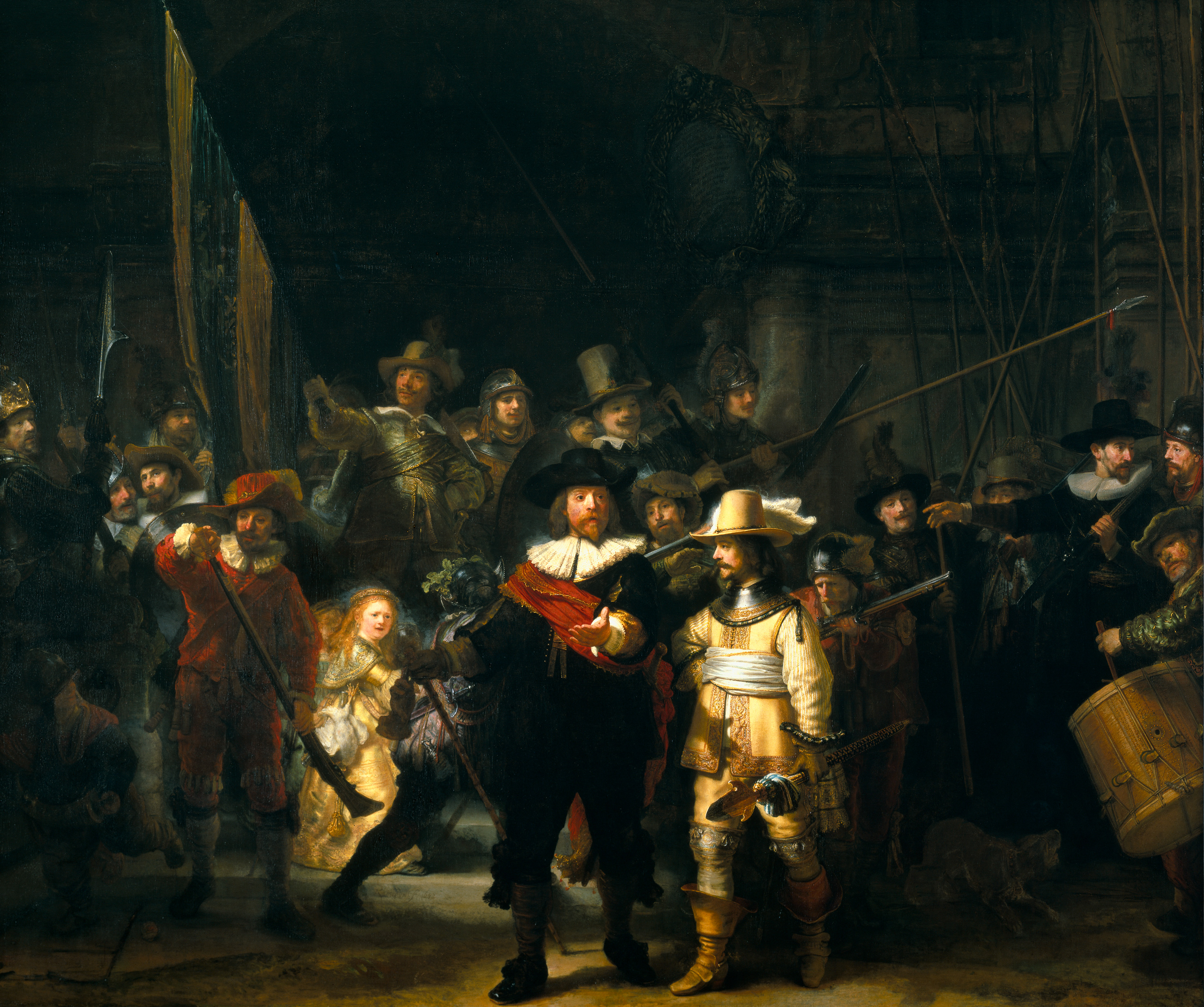
Rembrandt finishes The Night Watch.

=== January–March ===
- January 4 – King Charles I of England, accompanied by soldiers, arrives at a session of the Long Parliament and attempts to arrest his chief opponents, the Five Members, John Hampden, Arthur Haselrig, Denzil Holles, John Pym and William Strode, for what he regards as treason but they escape and are protected by the Lord Mayor of London. This is the last time any monarch enters the House of Commons.
- February 5 – The Bishops Exclusion Act is passed in England to prevent any member of the clergy from holding political office.
- February 15 – Royalist Endymion Porter is voted to be a "dangerous counsellor" by the English parliament.
- February 17 – The Treaty of Axim is signed between the Dutch West India Company and the chiefs of the Nzema people in the modern-day African nation of Ghana.
- February 18 – A group of Protestant English settlers in Ireland surrender to Irish authorities at Castlebar in County Mayo in hopes of having their lives spared, but are killed one week later at Shrule on orders of Edmond Bourke.
- February 20 – The Treaty of The Hague (1641), between the Dutch Republic and the Kingdom of Portugal, is ratified by the Republic's States-General.
- February 22 – The Italian opera Il palazzo incantato (The Enchanted Palace), by Luigi Rossi with libretto by Giulion Rospigliosi (the future Pope Clement IX), is given its first performance at the Teatro delle Quattro Fontane (Palazzo Barberini) in Rome.
- February 23–March 11 – Henrietta Maria, queen consort of England, and her eldest daughter Mary, newly created Princess Royal, leave Falmouth, Cornwall, to go into exile at the Dutch court in The Hague.
- March 1 – Georgeana, Massachusetts (later known as York, Maine) becomes the first incorporated city in the British colonies of North America.
- March 19 – Irish Rebellion of 1641: The citizens of Galway seize an English naval ship and close the town gates in support of the rebellion.

=== April–June ===
- April – Hannibal Sehested is appointed Governor-General of Norway.
- April 8 – Execution of George Spencer: the first hanging of a settler in the New Haven Colony takes place, on a wrongful conviction of bestiality.
- May 1 – Honours and titles granted by Charles I of England from this date onward will in 1646 be retrospectively annulled by Parliament.
- May 10 – In a Catholic synod at Kilkenny, bishops draft the Confederate Oath of Association, calling on Catholics to swear allegiance to King Charles I and to obey orders and decrees made by a "Supreme Council of the Confederate Catholics", hence the Irish rebels of 1641 become known as Confederate Ireland.
- May 17 – Ville-Marie (later Montreal) is founded as a permanent settlement.
- May 18 – The month-long Siege of Limerick in Ireland begins.
- June 1 – "Nineteen Propositions" are sent by the English House of Lords and House of Commons to Charles I, asking the King to consent to parliamentary approval for the members of his privy council, his chief officers, and new seats created for the House of Lords, as well as regulating the education and choice of marital partners of the King's children, and barring Roman Catholics from the Lords. The King's Answer, rejecting the Propositions, is read in Parliament on June 21.
- June 10 – Juan de Palafox y Mendoza, Archbishop of Mexico, dismisses the Viceroy of New Spain, Diego López Pacheco, allegedly on orders of King Philip IV, and takes office as the new Viceroy. Palafox is in office for only five months before being recalled to Spain.
- June 16 – Irish Confederate Wars: The Battle of Glenmaquin takes place in County Donegal, with the Protestant Laggan Army decisively defeating Confederate Ireland soldiers.
- June 23 – Siege of Limerick: the English Protestant garrison of King John's Castle (Limerick) is forced to surrender by the Confederate Ireland Munster army led by General Garret Barry.
- June 29 – The Battle of Barcelona begins at sea as a French Navy fleet of 75 ships, commanded by Admiral Jean Armand de Maillé-Brézé clashes off the coast of Spain with a Spanish fleet of 52 ships under the Duke of Ciudad Real.

=== July–September ===
- July 2 – Hundreds of sailors are killed when the French warship Galion de Guise and the Spanish galley Magdalena become entangled during the Battle of Barcelona. A French fireship attempts to burn the Magdalena and accidentally sets fire to the Galion de Guise, killing 500 of the 540 crew.
- July 3 – The French Navy wins the Battle of Barcelona.
- July 4 – The Committee of Safety is created by the English Parliament as a challenge to the authority of King Charles I. Five members of the House of Lords (Robert Devereux, 3rd Earl of Essex, Henry Rich, 1st Earl of Holland, Algernon Percy, 10th Earl of Northumberland, Philip Herbert, 4th Earl of Pembroke, and William Fiennes, 1st Viscount Saye and Sele) and ten members of the House of Commons (Nathaniel Fiennes, John Glynn, John Hampden, Denzil Holles, Henry Marten, John Merrick, William Pierrepoint, John Pym, Philip Stapleton and William Waller) are appointed to the Committee.
- July 10 – In a prelude to the First English Civil War, King Charles I of England besieges Hull in an attempt to gain control of its arsenal. The siege lasts until July 27, with Charles's Royalist Army failing to take the city from the Parliamentarians commanded by Governor John Hotham and General John Meldrum.
- July 12 – The English Parliament votes to raise its own Army, under the command of the Earl of Essex.
- August 3 – A Dutch Navy fleet of 14 warships, led by Hendric Harouse, begins a campaign to drive Spaniards from the island of Formosa (modern-day Taiwan) off of the coast of mainland China. After disembarking at Tamsui, the Dutch begin a siege of Fort Domingo, which falls on Saint Bartolomeo Day (August 24).
- August 4 – Irish Confederate Wars: Lord Forbes relieves Forthill, and besieges Galway.
- August 22 – First English Civil War begins when King Charles I raises the royal battle standard over Nottingham Castle, so declaring war on his own Parliament.
- September 2 – London theatre closure 1642: England's Long Parliament orders the theatres of London closed, effectively ending the era of English Renaissance theatre.
- September 7
  - First English Civil War: The Siege of Portsmouth (begun on 10 August) ends with the Royalist garrison surrendering the port to Parliament.
  - Irish Confederate Wars: Lord Forbes raises his unsuccessful siege of Galway.
- September 8 – Thomas Granger is executed by hanging in the Plymouth Colony (Massachusetts) following confessions to numerous acts of bestiality.
- September 23 – First English Civil War: Royalist victory at the Battle of Powick Bridge, a skirmish near Worcester which is the first engagement between elements of the principal field armies of the War.

=== October–December ===
- October 8 – 1642 Yellow River flood: Some 300,000 people die in the intentional breaking of the dams and dykes of the Yellow River, done by the Ming dynasty defenders of Kaifeng to break the siege by the large rebel force of Li Zicheng.
- October 23 – First English Civil War: Battle of Edgehill (Warwickshire) – Royalists and Parliamentarians battle to a draw in the first pitched battle of the War.
- October 24 – The first Confederate Assembly of Ireland is held in Kilkenny where it sets up a provisional government, largely Catholic Royalist; start of the Irish Confederate Wars.
- October 30 – King Charles I of England enters Oxford and establishes his court there.
- November 13 – First English Civil War: Battle of Turnham Green – The Royalist forces withdraw in face of the Parliamentarian army, and fail to take London.
- November 15 – First English Civil War: Sir Edward Ford, High Sheriff of Sussex, captures Chichester from the Parliamentarians without resistance. The Parliamentarians send Sir William Waller to recapture the city.
- November 24 – Abel Tasman and his crew become the first Europeans to discover "Van Diemen's Land", later the Australian island and state of Tasmania, and the island is claimed for the Netherlands on December 3 at what becomes Prince of Wales Bay.
- November 27 – Hong Taiji (known in the West as Abatai) begins a 60-day march of Manchu warriors southwards from the Great Wall through Ming Chinese provinces of Zhili and Shandong, before returning northward on January 27. (Two years later Beijing falls to rebels, the Chongzhen Emperor commits suicide, and the Shunzhi Emperor becomes the first Qing Emperor to rule over China proper.)
- December 13 – Abel Tasman and his crew become the first recorded Europeans to sight New Zealand, arriving at its South Island. In a battle between the Europeans and the Island's Maori inhabitants, four crew members are killed.
- December 21 – First English Civil War: After routing Edward Ford's royalist troops at the Battle of Muster Green, William Waller follows Ford's retreating force to Chichester as the Parliamentarians besiege the city, which falls on December 29 after eight days. The inhabitants of Chichester agree to pay the Parliamentarians an additional month's pay to prevent the town from being plundered.

=== Date unknown ===
- The village of Bro (Broo), Sweden is granted city rights for the second time and takes the name Kristinehamn (literally "Christina's port") after the Swedish monarch at this time, Queen Christina.
- Rembrandt finishes his painting The Night Watch (Militia Company of District II under the Command of Captain Frans Banninck Cocq) in Amsterdam.
- Isaac Aboab da Fonseca is appointed rabbi in Pernambuco, Brazil, thus becoming the first rabbi of the Americas.

== Births ==
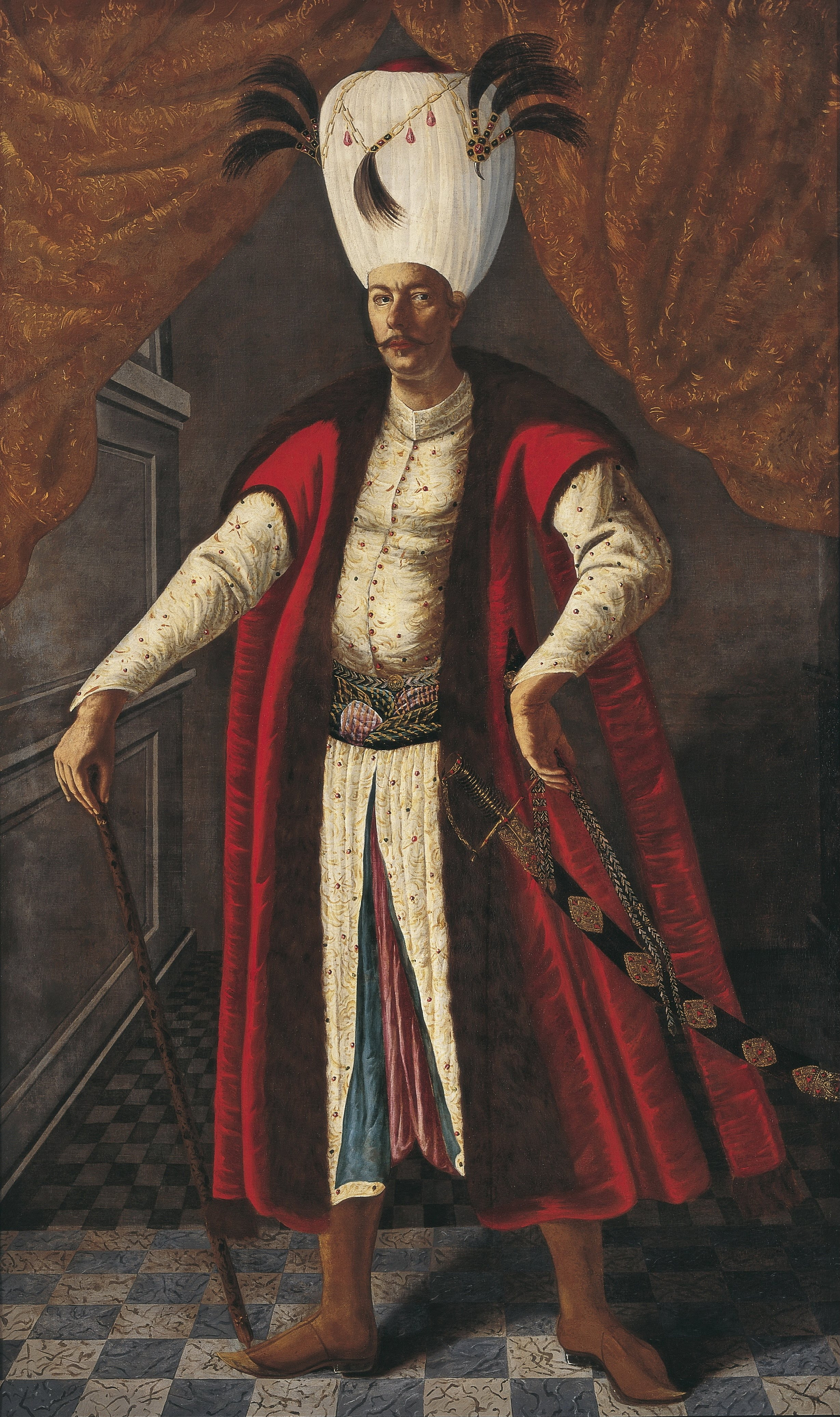
Mehmed IV

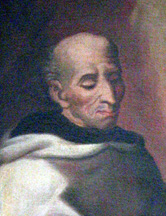
Angelo Paoli

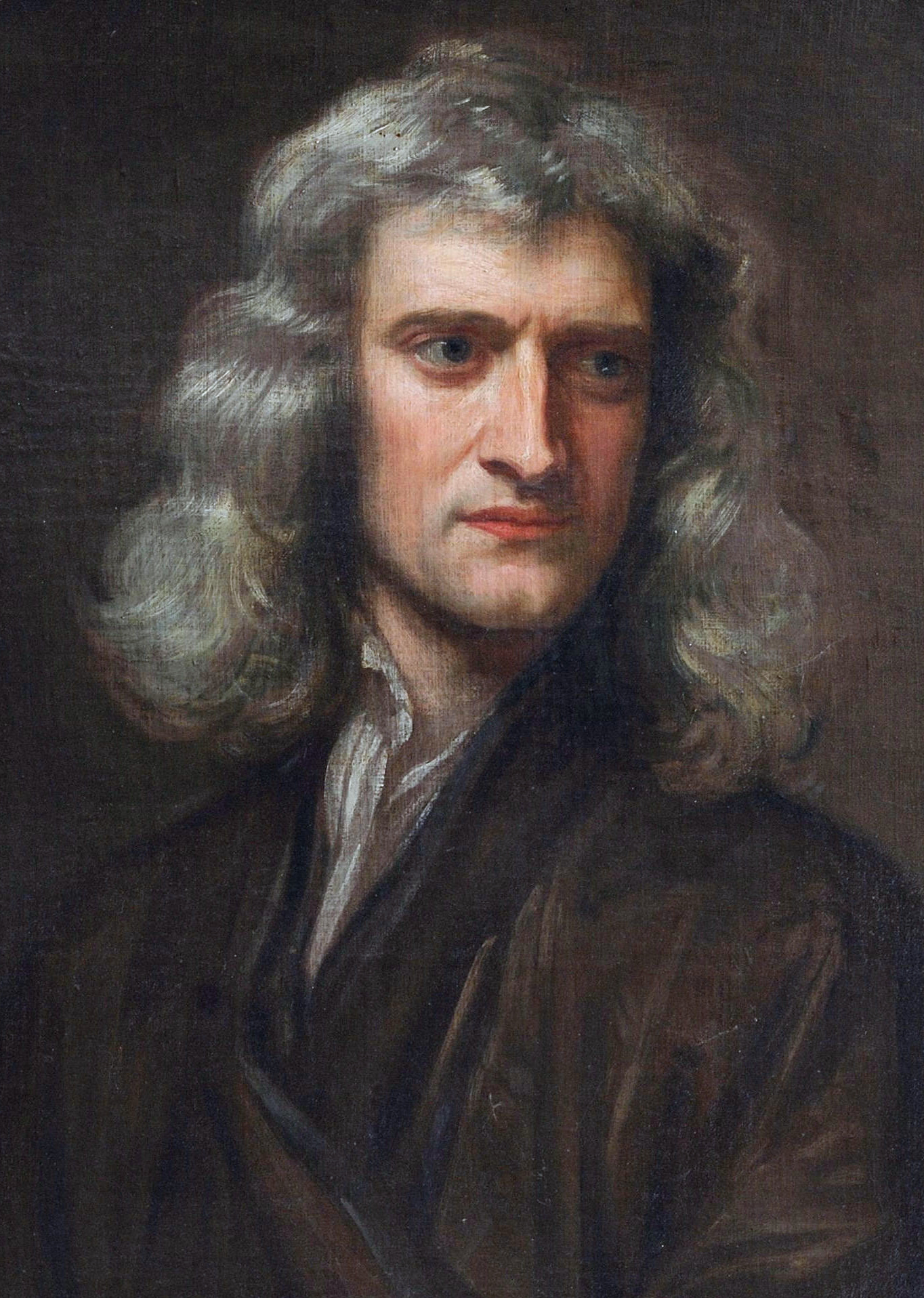
Isaac Newton

=== January–March ===
- January 2
  - Johannes van Haensbergen, Dutch Golden Age painter (d. 1705)
  - Mehmed IV, Sultan of the Ottoman Empire (1648-1687) (d. 1693)
- January 3 – Diego Morcillo Rubio de Auñón, Spanish-born Peruvian Catholic bishop (d. 1730)
- January 4 – Philippe Pierson, Belgian Jesuit missionary (d. 1688)
- January 5 – Johann Philipp Jeningen, German Catholic priest from Eichstätt, Bavaria (d. 1704)
- January 6
  - Julien Garnier, French Jesuit missionary to Canada (d. 1730)
  - Gisbert Steenwick, Dutch musician (d. 1679)
- January 11
  - Johann Friedrich Alberti, German composer and organist (d. 1710)
  - Mary Carleton, Englishwoman who used false identities (d. 1673)
- January 26 – Evert Collier, Dutch Golden Age painter (d. 1708)
- February 3 – Philip Aranda, Spanish Jesuit theologian (d. 1695)
- February 18 – Marie Champmeslé, French actress (d. 1698)
- March 2 – Claudio Coello, Spanish Baroque painter (d. 1693)
- March 4 – Stanisław Herakliusz Lubomirski, Polish noble (d. 1702)
- March 23 – Hester Davenport, English stage actress (d. 1717)
- March 25 – Anna Talbot, Countess of Shrewsbury, English countess (d. 1702)
- March 28 – Henry Wolrad, Count of Waldeck-Eisenberg (1645–1664) (d. 1664)
- March 29 – Emich Christian of Leiningen-Dagsburg, Lord of Broich, Oberstein and Bürgel (d. 1702)
- March 31 – Ephraim Curtis, American colonial military officer (d. 1684)

=== April–June ===
- April 15 – Suleiman II, Ottoman Sultan (d. 1691)
- April 21 – Simon de la Loubère, French diplomat (d. 1729)
- April 27 – Francisque Millet, Flemish-French painter (d. 1679)
- April 30 – Christian Weise, German writer, dramatist, poet, pedagogue and librarian (d. 1708)
- May 5 – James Tyrrell, English barrister and writer (d. 1718)
- June 8 – Frescheville Holles, English Member of Parliament (d. 1672)
- June 12 – Alexander Seton, 3rd Earl of Dunfermline, earl in the Peerage of Scotland (d. 1677)
- June 13 – Queen Myeongseong, Korean royal consort (d. 1684)
- June 18 – Paul Tallement the Younger, French writer (d. 1712)
- June 20 – George Hickes, English minister and scholar (d. 1715)
- June 28 – Jacob de Graeff, member of the De Graeff-family from the Dutch Golden Age (d. 1690)

=== July–September ===
- July 3 – Joseph-François Hertel de la Fresnière, military officer of New France (d. 1722)
- July 7 – Gregorio II Boncompagni, Italian nobleman, 5th Duke of Sora (d. 1707)
- July 25 – Louis I of Monaco, Monegasque prince (d. 1701)
- August 3 – Robert Austen, English politician (d. 1696)
- August 12 – Andrea Scacciati, Italian painter (d. 1710)
- August 14 – Cosimo III de' Medici, Grand Duke of Tuscany (d. 1723)
- September 1 – Angelo Paoli, Italian beatified (d. 1720)
- September 5 – Maria of Orange-Nassau, Dutch princess (d. 1688)
- September 6 – Georg Christoph Bach, German composer (d. 1697)
- September 23 – Giovanni Maria Bononcini, Italian violinist and composer (d. 1678)

=== October–December ===
- October 12 – Abraham van Calraet, Dutch painter (d. 1722)
- November 4 – Zheng Jing, Chinese pirate (d. 1681)
- November 5 – Nils Gyldenstolpe, Swedish count, official and diplomat (d. 1709)
- November 9 – Sir John Lowther, 2nd Baronet, of Whitehaven, English politician (d. 1706)
- November 11 – André Charles Boulle, French cabinet-maker (d. 1732)
- November 16 – Cornelis Evertsen the Youngest, Dutch admiral (d. 1706)
- November 24 – Anne Hilarion de Tourville, French naval commander under King Louis XIV (d. 1701)
- November 30 – Andrea Pozzo, Jesuit Brother, architect and painter (d. 1709)
- December 6
  - Johann Christoph Bach, German composer and organist (d. 1703)
  - Gerard Callenburgh, Dutch admiral (d. 1722)
- December 8 – Nicolas Roland, French priest and founder (d. 1678)
- December 13 – Friedrich Seyler, Swiss theologian (d. 1708)
- December 17
  - Francisco Castillo Fajardo, Marquis of Villadarias, Spanish general (d. 1716)
  - Francis de Geronimo, Italian priest (d. 1716)
- December 23 (O.S.) – John Holt, English lawyer (d. 1710)
- December 25 (O.S.) – Sir Isaac Newton, English scientist (d. 1727)
- December 30
  - Vincenzo da Filicaja, Italian poet (d. 1707)
  - François Roger de Gaignières, French genealogist, antiquary, collector (d. 1715)

=== Date unknown ===
- Abdul-Qādir Bedil, Persian Sufi poet (d. 1720)
- Bonaventure Giffard, English Catholic priest (d. 1734)
- Thomas Hancorne, Welsh clergyman and theologian (d. 1731)
- Albert Janse Ryckman, Mayor of Albany, prominent brewermaster (d. 1737)
- Marie Anne de La Trémoille, princesse des Ursins, politically active Spanish court official (d. 1722)

== Deaths ==
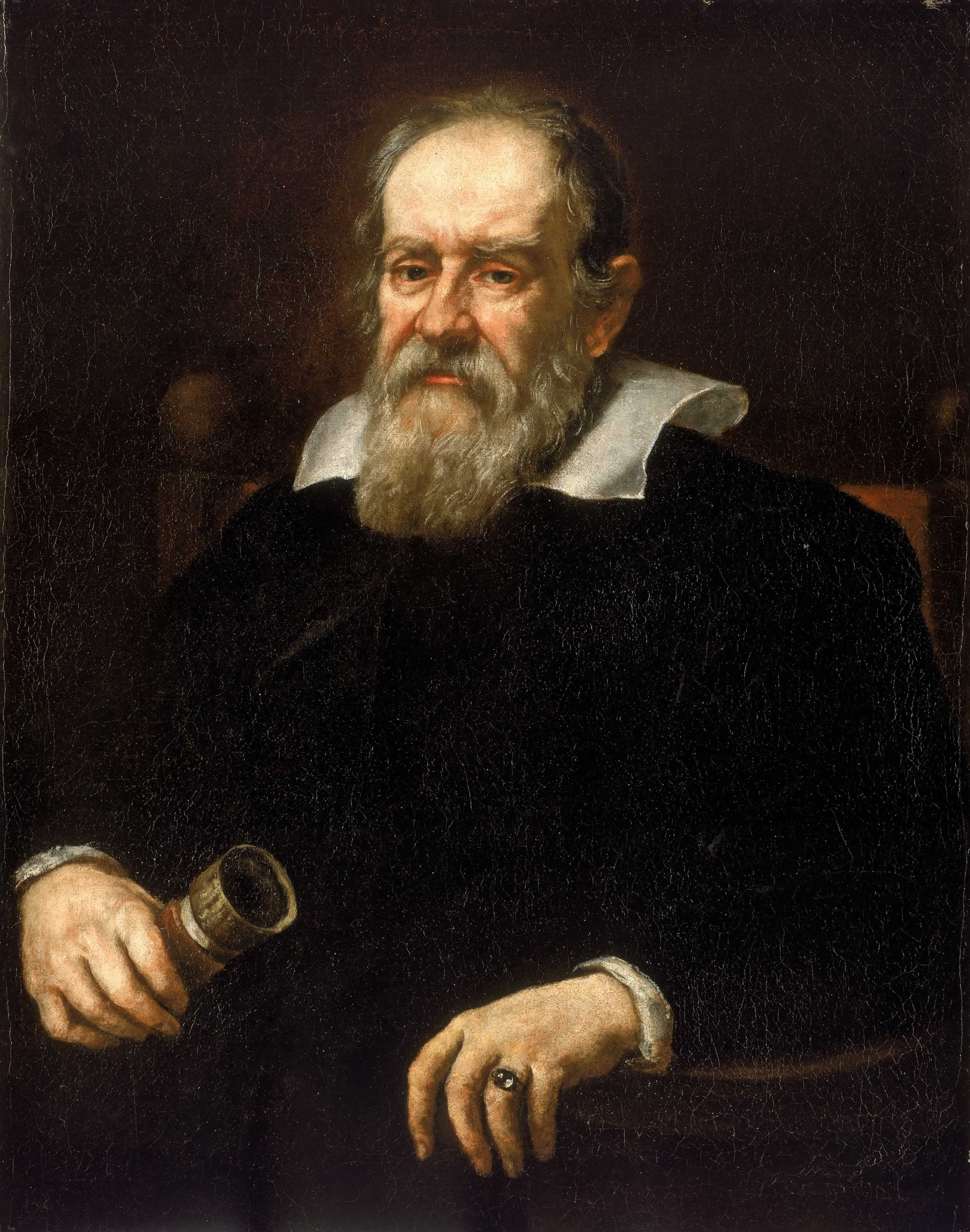
Galileo Galilei

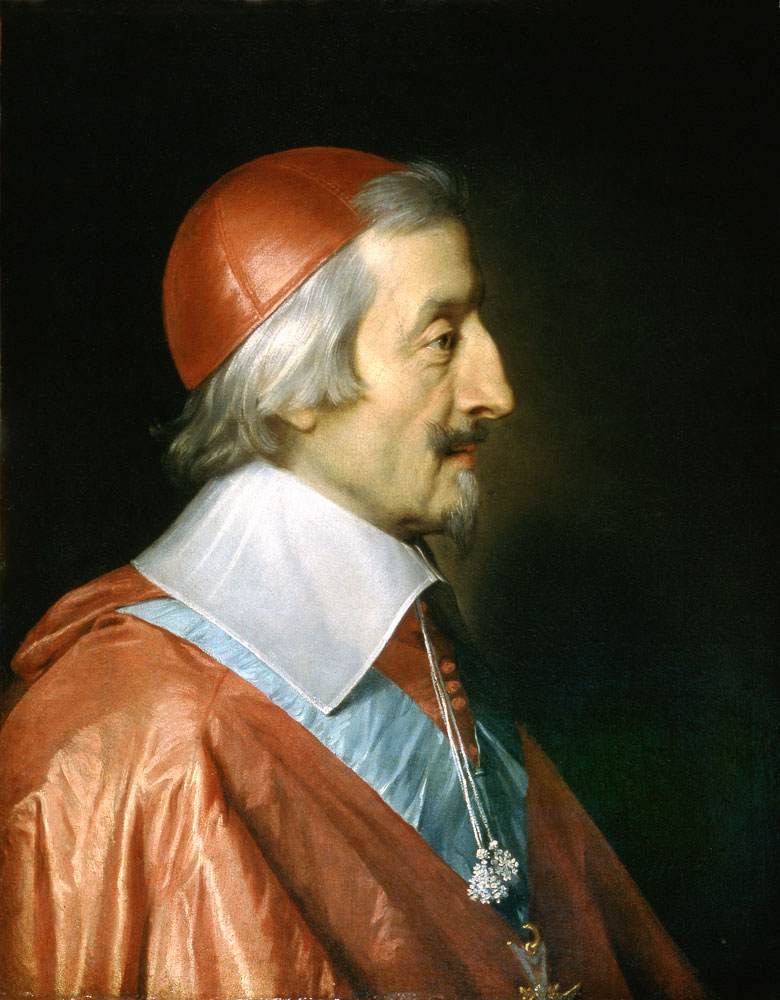
Cardinal Richelieu

- January 8 – Galileo Galilei, Italian astronomer and physicist (b. 1564)
- January 12 – Johann Ernst, Count of Hanau-Münzenberg (1641–1642) (b. 1613)
- January 13 – Sophia Hedwig of Brunswick-Lüneburg, German noblewoman (b. 1592)
- January 21 – Alban Roe, English Benedictine martyr (b. 1583)
- February 7 – William Bedell, English clergyman (b. 1571)
- February 19 – Jørgen Knudsen Urne, Danish noble (b. 1598)
- March 30 – William Augustus, Duke of Brunswick-Harburg (b. 1564)
- April 30 – Dmitry Pozharsky, Russian prince (b. 1578)
- May 9 – Jacques Bonfrère, Flemish Jesuit priest and biblical scholar (b. 1573)
- May 24 – Polyxena von Lobkowicz, politically active Czech aristocrat (b. 1566)
- June 14 – Saskia van Uylenburgh, wife and painter's model of Rembrandt (b. 1612)
- July 3 – Marie de' Medici, French queen consort and regent (b. 1573)
- July 4 – Erzsébet Thurzó, Hungarian noblewoman (b. 1621)
- July 5 – Festus Hommius, Dutch theologian (b. 1576)
- July 17 – William, Count of Nassau-Siegen, German count (b. 1592)
- July 25 – Crato, Count of Nassau-Saarbrücken (1640–1642) (b. 1621)
- July 30 – Franz von Hatzfeld, Prince-Bishop of Würzburg (b. 1596)
- August 18 – Guido Reni, Italian painter (b. 1575)
- September 3 – Countess Elisabeth of Nassau, regent of Sedan (b. 1577)
- September 8 – Herman de Neyt, Flemish painter (b. 1588)
- September 12 – Henri Coiffier de Ruzé, Marquis of Cinq-Mars, French conspirator, executed (b. 1620)
- September 29 – René Goupil, French Jesuit missionary, first of the Canadian Martyrs (b. 1608)
- October 3 – Charles Howard, 2nd Earl of Nottingham, English noble (b. 1579)
- October 19 – Giovanni Doria, Spanish noble (b. 1573)
- October 23 – George Stewart, 9th Seigneur d'Aubigny, Scottish nobleman and military commander (b. 1618)
- October 24 – Robert Bertie, 1st Earl of Lindsey, English Fen drainage adventurer and soldier (b. 1583)
- November 1 – Jean Nicolet, French explorer (b. 1598)
- November 7 – Henry Montagu, 1st Earl of Manchester, English politician (b. c. 1563)
- November 14 – Henry Wallop, English politician (b. 1568)
- November 24 – Walatta Petros, saint in the Ethiopian Orthodox Tewahedo Church (b. 1592)
- November 25 – Christian Günther I, Count of Schwarzburg-Sondershausen since 1601 (b. 1578)
- December 4 – Armand Jean du Plessis, Cardinal Richelieu, French statesman (b. 1585)
- December 6 – Charles Caesar, English politician and judge (b. 1590)
- December 23 – Louis de Dieu, Dutch theologian (b. 1590)
- December 27 – Herman op den Graeff, Dutch bishop (b. 1585)
- date unknown – Eudemus I of Georgia, Catholicos Patriarch, killed
