= 1520 =

1520 in various calendars
- Gregorian calendar: 1520; MDXX
- Ab urbe condita: 2273
- Armenian calendar: 969; ԹՎ ՋԿԹ
- Assyrian calendar: 6270
- Balinese saka calendar: 1441–1442
- Bengali calendar: 926–927
- Berber calendar: 2470
- English Regnal year: 11 Hen. 8 – 12 Hen. 8
- Buddhist calendar: 2064
- Burmese calendar: 882
- Byzantine calendar: 7028–7029
- Chinese calendar: 己卯年 (Earth Rabbit); 4217 or 4010 — to — 庚辰年 (Metal Dragon); 4218 or 4011
- Coptic calendar: 1236–1237
- Discordian calendar: 2686
- Ethiopian calendar: 1512–1513
- Hebrew calendar: 5280–5281
- Hindu calendars
- Vikram Samvat: 1576–1577
- Shaka Samvat: 1441–1442
- Kali Yuga: 4620–4621
- Holocene calendar: 11520
- Igbo calendar: 520–521
- Iranian calendar: 898–899
- Islamic calendar: 926–927
- Japanese calendar: Eishō 17 (永正１７年)
- Javanese calendar: 1437–1438
- Julian calendar: 1520; MDXX
- Korean calendar: 3853
- Minguo calendar: 392 before ROC 民前392年
- Nanakshahi calendar: 52
- Thai solar calendar: 2062–2063
- Tibetan calendar: ས་མོ་ཡོས་ལོ་ (female Earth-Hare); 1646 or 1265 or 493 — to — ལྕགས་ཕོ་འབྲུག་ལོ་ (male Iron-Dragon); 1647 or 1266 or 494

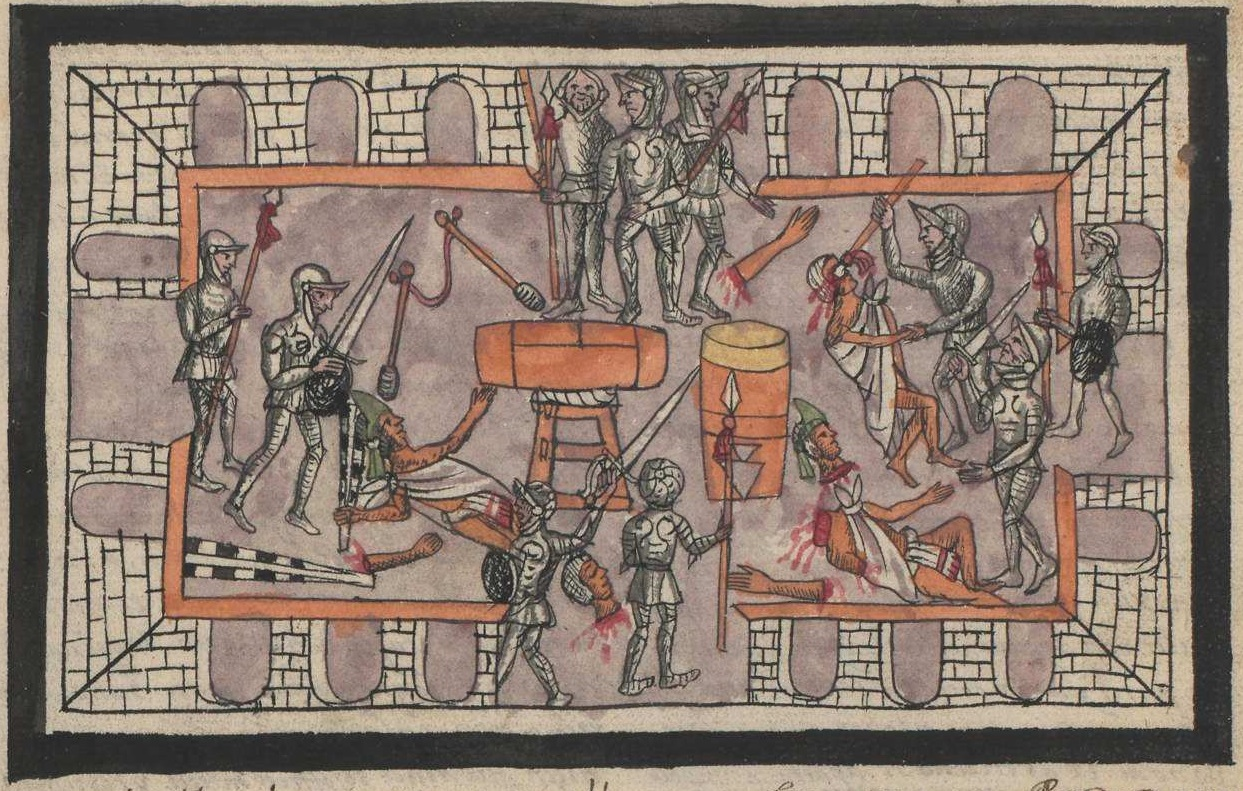
May 22: Aztec warriors and nobles are massacred by the Spaniards at Tenochtitlan

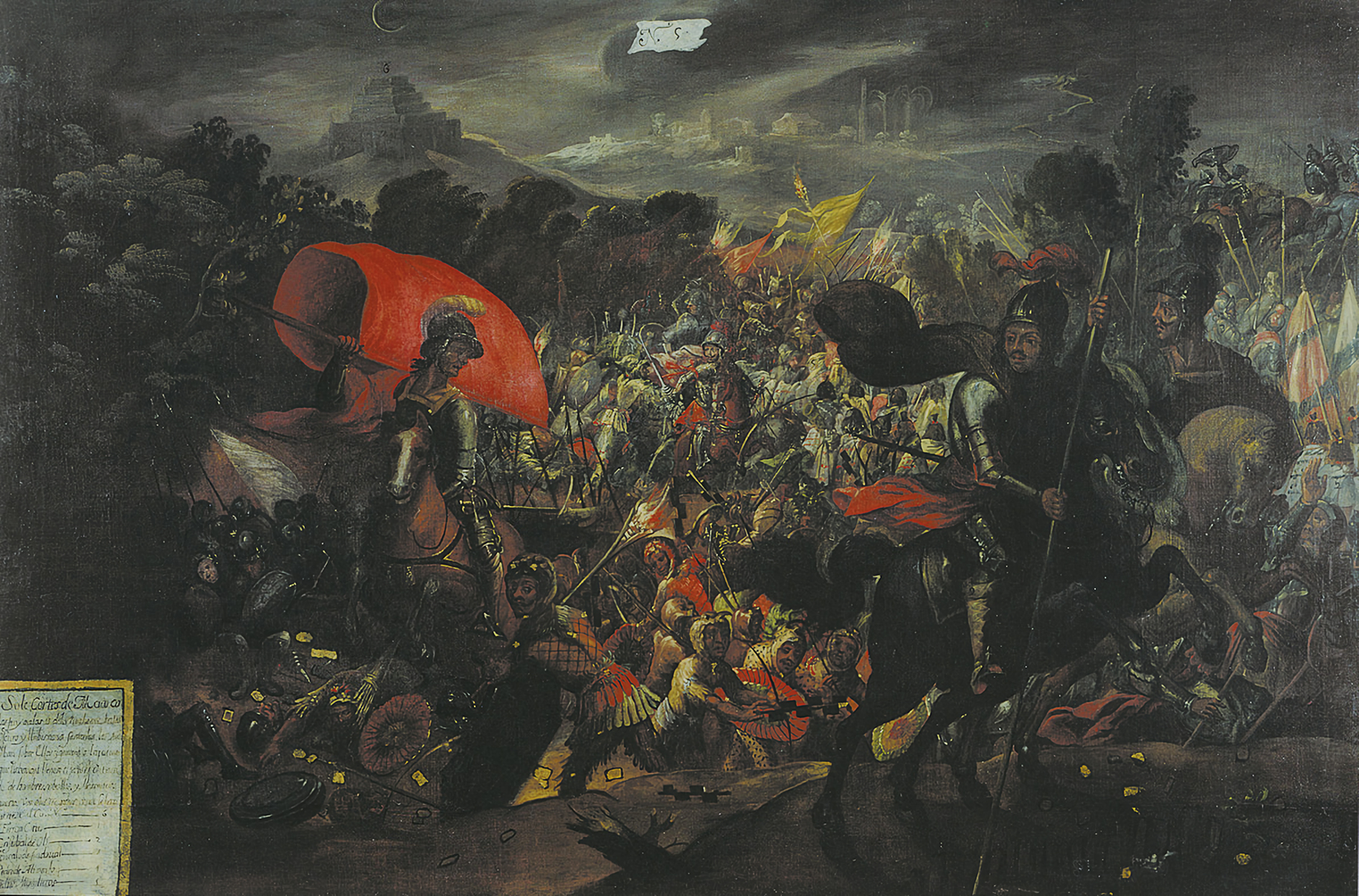
June 30–July 1: Hundreds of Spanish conquistadors are killed by Aztec warriors during La Noche Triste

Year 1520 (MDXX) was a leap year starting on Sunday of the Julian calendar.

== Events ==
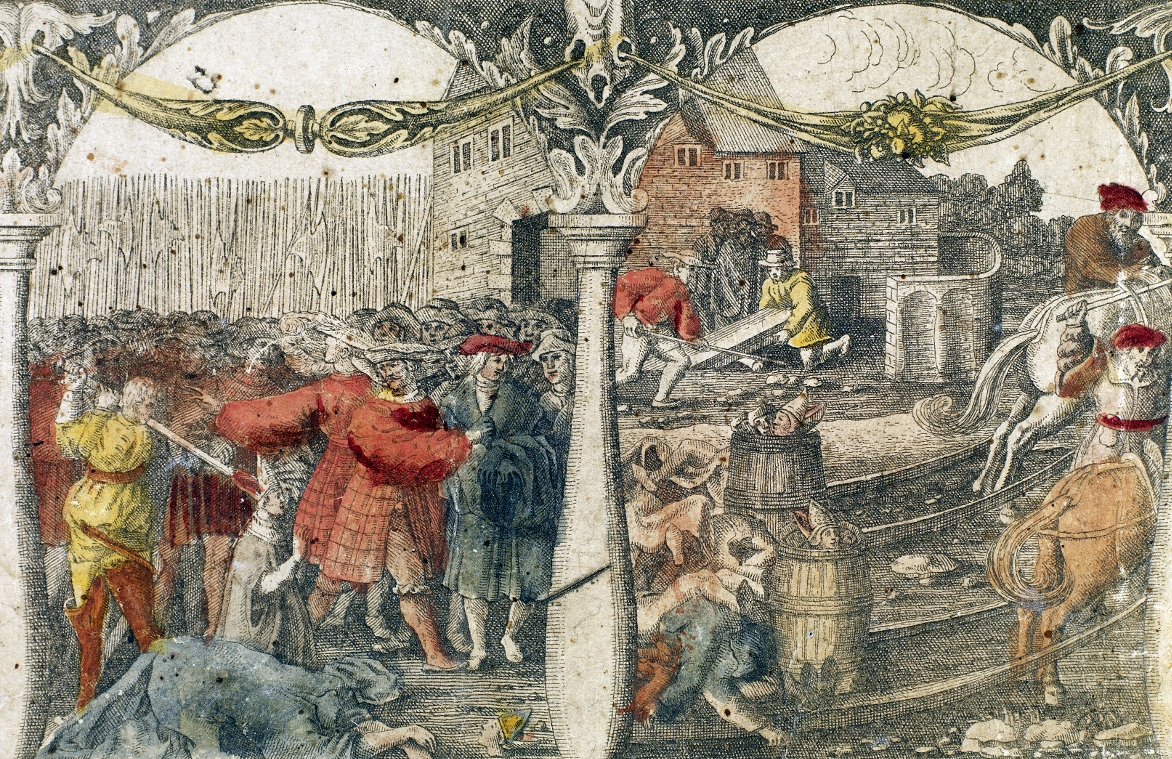
November 8: Stockholm Bloodbath

=== January–March ===
- January 19 – King Christian II of Denmark and Norway defeats the Swedes, at Lake Åsunden in Sweden. The Swedish regent Sten Sture the Younger is mortally wounded in the Battle of Bogesund. He is rushed towards Stockholm, in order to lead the fight against the Danes from there.
- February 3 – Swedish regent Sten Sture dies from his wounds leaving a vacancy on the throne that allows King Christian II of Denmark to conquer Sweden within eight months.
- February 6 – The Swabian League sells the Duchy of Württemberg to the Holy Roman Emperor, Charles V, for 220,000 florins and payment of the Duchy's debt of 1,100,000 Goldgulden
- March 10 – Thomas Howard, 3rd Duke of Norfolk becomes England's new Lord Deputy of Ireland
- March 31 – The Magellan expedition, led by Portuguese explorer Ferdinand Magellan (Fernão de Magalhães), pauses in its attempt to sail around the world, stopping at Puerto San Julian on the lower east coast of what is now Patagonia in Argentina. His fleet consists of Magellan's flagship, Trinidad, and four other vessels, Concepción, Victoria, San Antonio and Santiago.

=== April–June ===
- April 2 – Juan de Cartagena, formerly captain of the largest ship on the Magellan expedition, San Antonio, escapes captivity from the Victoria and begins a mutiny against Ferdinand Magellan. He is joined by Gaspar de Quesada, captain of the Concepción, and Luis de Mendoza, captain of the Victoria. On the first day of the rebellion, under the pretense of delivering Magellan's letter of surrender to the Victoria, several crew from the Magellan's flagship Trinidad stab Mendoza to death, and the rest of the Victoria crew seizes the mutineers.
- April 3 – The crew of the San Antonio surrenders to Magellan after being unable to stop drifting in strong winds and being fired at by a cannon, and Gaspar de Quesada surrenders the Concepcion. Four days later, Quesada is beheaded along with other mutineers, while Cartagena is left on an island by Magellan in August.
- April 16 – Revolt of the Comuneros: Citizens of Toledo, Castile opposed to the rule of the Flemish-born Charles V, Holy Roman Emperor, rise up when the royal government attempts to unseat radical city councilors.
- May 7 – The semi-independent Duchy of Mecklenburg, in what is now Germany, is partitioned into two duchies, Mecklenburg-Schwerin and Mecklenburg-Strelitz.
- May 22 –
  - The Massacre in the Great Temple of Tenochtitlan takes place in Mexico after the Aztec Emperor Moctezuma II is allowed by the Deputy Governor of New Spain, Pedro de Alvarado, to host Aztec nobles at the Great Temple at Tenochtitlan to celebrate the Feat of Toxcatl in honor of the god Tezcatlipoca. Alvarado uses the opportunity to kill more than 600 Aztec warriors and commanders, but spares Moctezuma.
  - The Magellan expedition loses its first ship as the caravel Santiago is wrecked in a storm while sailing inland on Argentina's Santa Cruz River
- June 7 – King Henry VIII of England and King Francis I of France meet at the famous Field of the Cloth of Gold.
- June 10 – Revolt of the Comuneros: Segovia is blockaded.
- June 15 – Pope Leo X issues the bull Exsurge Domine (Arise O Lord), threatening Martin Luther with excommunication, if he does not recant his position on indulgences and other Catholic doctrines.
- June 29 – Moctezuma II, Aztec ruler of Tenochtitlan, is assassinated by other Aztec leaders as he attempts to address his people. His brother Cuitláhuac rises to the throne.

=== July–September ===
- July 1 – La Noche Triste (Night of Sorrow): The forces of Cuitláhuac, Aztec ruler of Tenochtitlan, gain a major victory against the forces of conquistador Hernán Cortés. This results in the death of about 400 conquistadors, and some 2,000 of their Native American allies. However, Cortés and the most skilled of his men manage to escape and later regroup.
- July 7 – Otumba near Lake Texcaco: The Spaniards defeat the Aztecs.
- August 11 – Ferdinand Magellan maroons the two surviving people who had attempted a mutiny against him, Captain Juan de Cartagena and Father Pedro Sánchez de la Reina, placing them on an island off of the coast of Argentina and providing them with a small supply of ship's biscuits and drinking water. Cartagena and Sanchez are never heard from again.
- August 21 – After wintering in Patagonia in Argentina, the Magellan expedition resumes its attempt to become the first crew to sail around the world.
- August 24 – The French warrior René of Savoy departs from Marseille on his flagship, Sainte Marie de Bonaventure on a four-month mission to protect the Knights Hospitaller against an attack by the Ottoman Turks.
- August – Martin Luther publishes To the Christian Nobility of the German Nation.
- September 7 – Christian II of Denmark makes his triumphant entry into Stockholm, which had surrendered to him a few days earlier. Sten Sture's widow Christina Gyllenstierna, who has led the fight after Sten's death, and all other persons in the resistance against the Danes, are granted amnesty and are pardoned for their involvement in the resistance.
- September 22 – Suleiman I succeeds his father Selim I as Sultan of the Ottoman Empire. He is officially crowned on September 30 and will rule until 1566.

=== October–December ===
- October 21 (Feast of St. Ursula) – The islands of Saint Pierre and Miquelon are discovered by Portuguese explorer João Álvares Fagundes, off Newfoundland. He names them Islands of the 11,000 Virgins, in honour of Saint Ursula.
- October 23 – Charles V is crowned King of Germany in Aachen.
- October 21 – The four remaining ships of the Magellan expedition and their crews confirm that they have found the passage that will be named the Strait of Magellan, the passage between the Atlantic and Pacific Oceans. The crew of the San Antonio, led by Estêvão Gomes elects not to sail into strait and begins journeying back to Spain.
- November 1 – Christian II is crowned king of Sweden in Nikolai Church. The coronation is followed by a three-day feast in Stockholm.
- November 7 – At the end of the third day of Christian's coronation feast, several leading figures of the Swedish resistance against the Danish invasion are imprisoned, and tried for high treason.
- November 9– Stockholm Bloodbath: The execution of 82 Swedish noblemen and clergymen, having been sentenced to death for their involvement in the Swedish resistance against the Danish invasion, is completed after two days of beheading.
- November 25 – Cuauhtémoc becomes the last Aztec Emperor after the death from smallpox of the Emperor Cuitláhuac, who reigned for only 80 days.Orozco y Berra, Manuel (1880). Historia antigua y de la conquista de México (Ancient history of the conquest of Mexico). Tipografía de Gonzalo A. Esteva. p. 493.
- November 28 – After navigating through the strait at the southern end of South America, three ships under the command of Portuguese explorer Ferdinand Magellan reach the Pacific Ocean. Magellan thankful to find a peaceful sea after the dangerous trip through the strait, names the body of water "El Mar Pacifico" because of its pacifying waters. becoming the first Europeans to sail from the Atlantic Ocean to the Pacific (the strait is later named the Strait of Magellan).
- December 10 – Martin Luther burns a copy of The Book of Canon Law (see Canon Law), and his copy of the Papal bull Exsurge Domine.

=== Date unknown ===
- The Franciscan friar Matteo Bassi is inspired to return to the primitive life of solitude and penance, as practiced by St. Francis, giving rise to the Order of Friars Minor Capuchin.
- Duarte Barbosa returns to Cananor.
- Aleksandra Lisowska (Roxelana) is given as a gift to Suleiman I on the occasion of his accession to the throne.
- King Manuel I creates the public mail service of Portugal, the Correio Público.

== Births ==
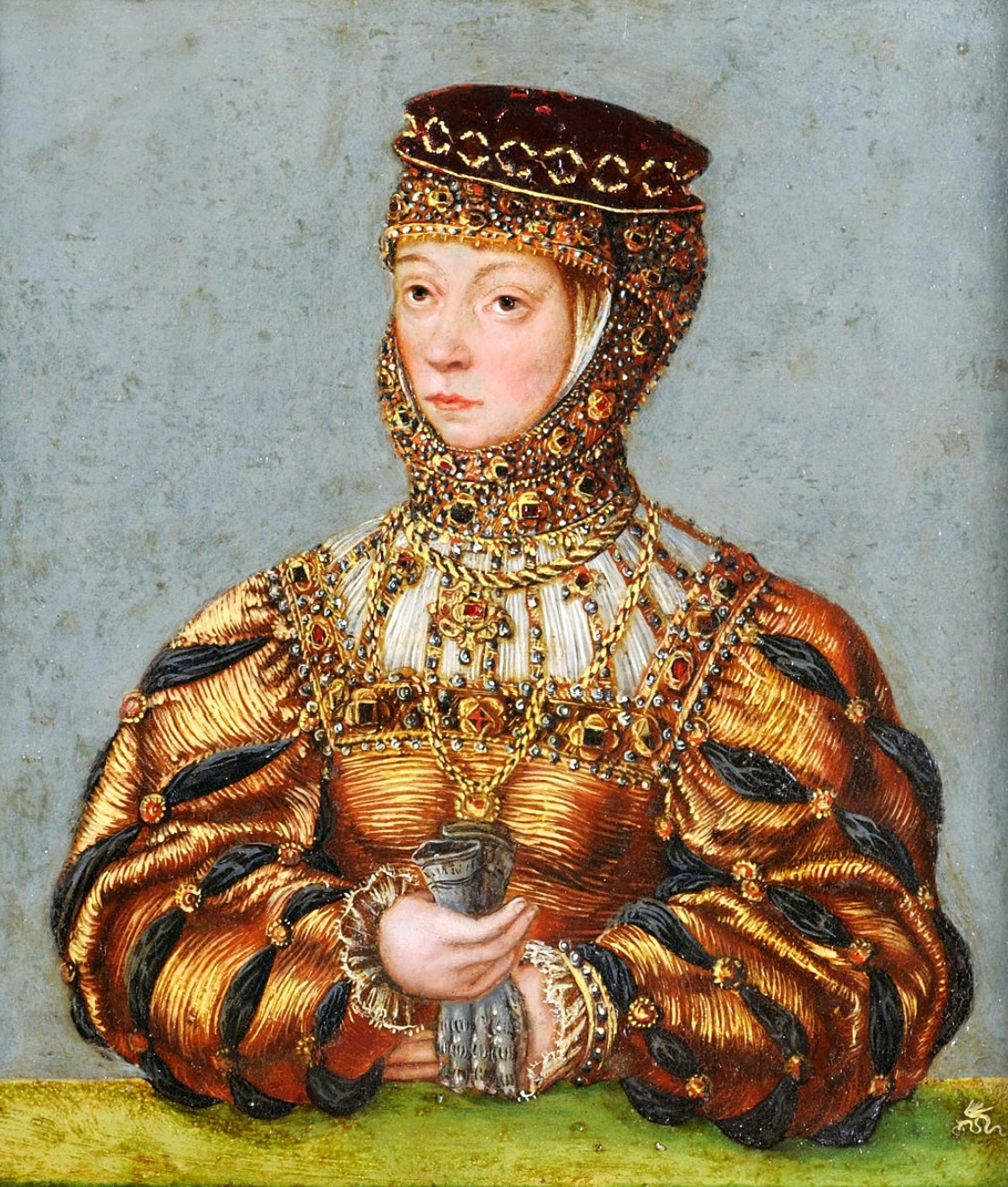
Barbara Radziwiłł

- January 7 – Peder Oxe, Danish finance minister (d. 1575)
- January 30 – William More, English courtier (d. 1600)
- February 22 – Frederick III of Legnica, Duke of Legnica (d. 1570)
- March 3 – Matthias Flacius, Croatian Protestant reformer (d. 1575)
- June 29 – Nicolás Factor, Spanish artist (d. 1583)
- July 27 – Gonzalo II Fernández de Córdoba, Governor of the Duchy of Milan (d. 1578)
- August 1 – King Sigismund II Augustus of Poland (d. 1572)
- August 10 – Madeleine of Valois, queen of James V of Scotland (d. 1537)
- August 21 – Bartholomäus Sastrow, German official (d. 1603)
- August 31 – Heinrich Sudermann, German politician (d. 1591)
- September 13 – William Cecil, 1st Baron Burghley, English statesman, chief advisor to Queen Elizabeth I (d. 1598)
- October 7 – Alessandro Farnese, Italian cardinal (d. 1589)
- November 10 – Dorothea of Denmark, Electress Palatine, Princess of Denmark, Sweden and Norway (d. 1580)
- December 6 – Barbara Radziwiłł, queen of Poland (d. 1551)
- December 24 – Martha Leijonhufvud, politically active Swedish noble (d. 1584)
- date unknown
  - Patriarch Metrophanes III of Constantinople (d. 1580)
  - Jean Ribault, French navigator (d. 1565)
  - Vincenzo Galilei, Italian music theorist, lutenist, and composer (d. 1591)
  - Aben Humeya, last independent king of Granada (d. 1568)
  - Ijuin Tadaaki, Japanese nobleman (d. 1561)
  - Agatha Streicher, German physician (d. 1581)
  - Katarina Bengtsdotter Gylta, Swedish abbess (d. 1593)
  - Johannes Acronius Frisius, German doctor and mathematician (d. 1564)
- probable
  - Hans Eworth, Flemish portrait painter (d. 1574)
  - Katharina Gerlachin, German printer (d. 1592)
  - Jorge de Montemor, Spanish novelist and poet (d. 1561)
  - Giovanni Battista Moroni, Italian mannerist painter (d. 1578)

== Deaths ==
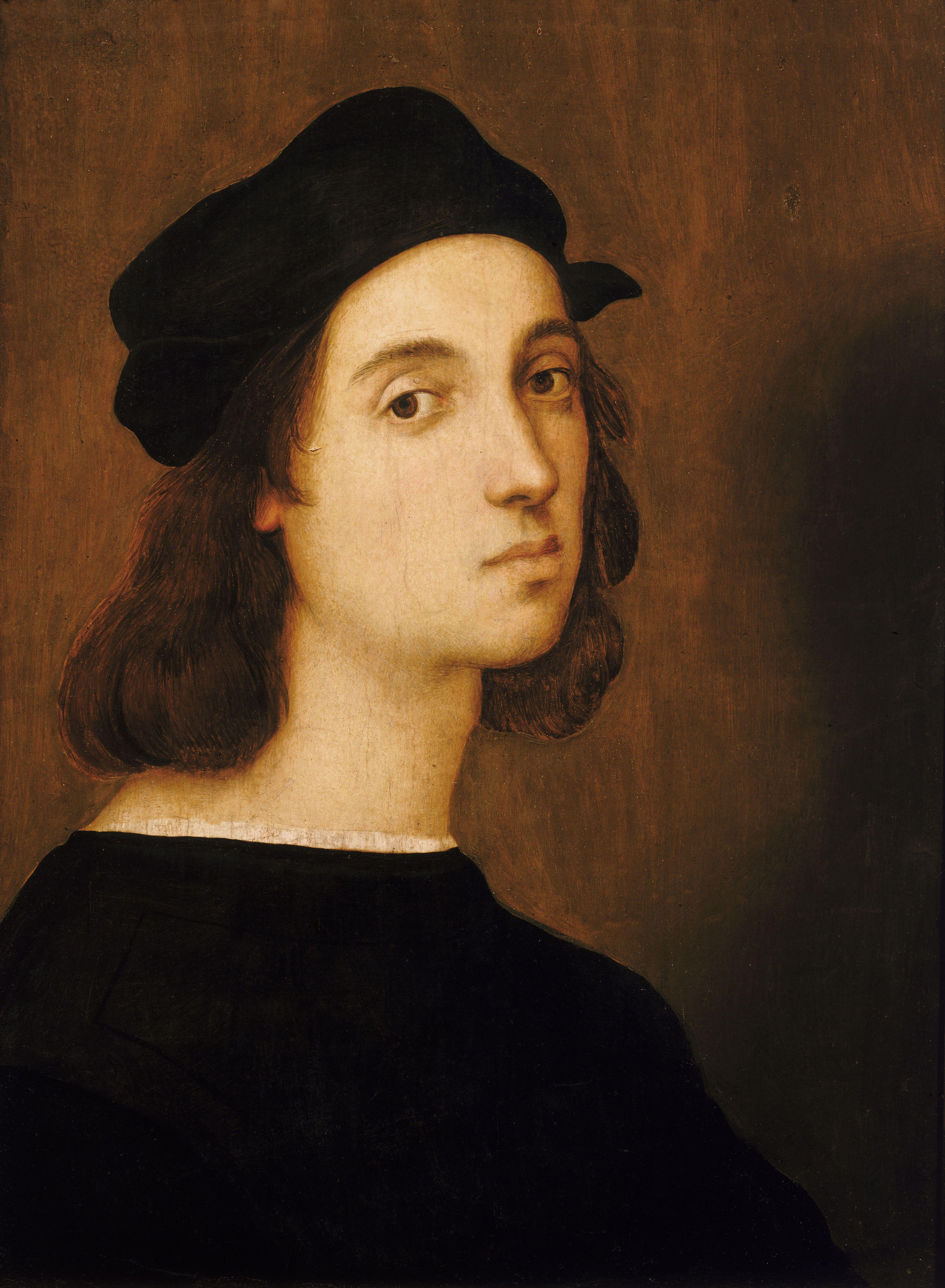
Raphael

- January 10 – Cho Kwangjo, Korean philosopher (b. 1482)
- February 3 – Sten Sture the Younger, Viceroy of Sweden (b. 1493)
- February 7 – Alfonsina de' Medici, née Orsini, Regent of Florence (b. 1472)
- April 6 – Raphael, Italian painter and architect (b. 1483)
- May 22 – Jan Lubrański, Polish bishop (b. 1456)
- June 24 – Hosokawa Sumimoto, Japanese samurai commander (b. 1489)
- June 29 – Moctezuma II, 9th Tlatoani (emperor) of the Aztecs, assassinated or possibly killed in a riot, 1502-1520 (b. 1466)
- August 6 – Kunigunde of Austria, Archduchess of Austria (b. 1465)
- September 3 – Ippolito d'Este, Italian Catholic cardinal (b. 1479)
- September 22 – Selim I, Ottoman Sultan (b. 1470)
- October – Cuitláhuac, 10th Tlatoani (emperor) of the Aztecs, 1520, brother of Moctezuma II, smallpox (b. c. 1476)
- November 9 – Bernardo Dovizi, Italian Catholic cardinal (b. 1470)
- date unknown
  - Cacamatzin, king of Texcoco (altepetl) (modern Mexico) (b. 1483)
  - Ratna Malla, first Raja of Kantipur
  - Visoun, king of Lan Xang (b. 1465)
  - Sheikh Hamdullah, Ottoman calligrapher (b. 1436)
  - Clara Tott, German court singer (b. 1440)
- probable – Filippo de Lurano, Italian composer (b. 1475)
