= Agatha Streicher =

German physician (1520–1581)

- Born: 1520; Ulm, Germany
- Died: 1581 (aged 60–61); Ulm, Germany
- Occupation: physician
- Known for: First female physician in Germany

Agatha Streicher (1520–1581), was a German physician who lived her entire life in Ulm. She has been referred to as the first female physician in Germany.

Streicher was prohibited from studying medicine at the University because she was a woman. However, she studied medicine privately, likely from her brother Hans Augustin, who was a medical doctor. She was acknowledged to have sufficient knowledge to practice medicine in her hometown of Ulm and on 15 March 1561, Streicher was allowed to take the Hippocratic Oath, which had been binding since 1533. In this way, she was appointed as a "non-academic doctor in Ulm and was allowed to do medicine in private practice."

Her reputation spread far and wide and many personalities came to Ulm for treatment, such as the Princess of Hohenzollern and the Bishop of Speyer. She was particularly known for her remedy for bladder stones that she produced herself. In 1576, she was even called to Regensburg to the bedside of Maximilian II, Holy Roman Emperor who suffered from severe gout. Although she could not cure the emperor, she prescribed four medications to alleviate his suffering and remained with him until his death.

Streicher was a successful businesswoman and contributed to the reputation of the city of Ulm. In her will she remembered the poor and destitute.

She is memorialized with a statue, a memorial, and a street named after her in Ulm. A novel by Ursula Niehaus was written about Streicher.
