= Jean de Brisacier =

Jean de Brisacier (b. Blois, France, 9 June 1592 or 1603; d. there, 10 September 1668) was a Jesuit controversialist and opponent of Jansenism.

== Career ==
He entered the Society of Jesus in 1619; on the completion of his studies, he gave himself to preaching for many years. Afterwards he was in turn Rector of the colleges of Aix, Blois, Rouen, and Clermont, Visitor to the province of Portugal, Procurator of the Paris Foreign Missions Society and Superior of the Professed House in Paris. His love for missionary work was such that shortly before his death, he remarked that he counted as nothing all the years he had not spent in it.

=== Brisacier Affair ===
In 1651, Brisacier, then rector of Blois, gave two sermons attacking John Callaghan, curé of Cour-Cheverny, for his Jansenist beliefs. Callaghan had ties to Port-Royal-des-Champs, a Cistercian abbey known for its Jansenism. Anne Hurault de Cheverny, marquise d'Aumont, a patron of the abbey, had recently appointed him curé in the hope that he would evangelize for their beliefs in Cour-Cheverny.

These sermons quickly grew into a controversy which became known as the Brisacier Affair. In reply to the Jansenists' answer to his sermons, Brisacier repeated his charges, in a publication entitled Le jansénisme confondu dans l'advocat du sieur Callaghan, par le P. Brisacier, avec la deffense de son sermon fait à Blois, le 29 Mars, 1651, contre la response du Port Royal. This work was quickly condemned by Jean François Paul de Gondi, Archbishop of Paris, because of its personal attacks directed especially against the Jansenists of Port-Royal. After this censure the dispute continued for some time, and called forth a long series of pamphlets. As late as 1862, the controversy was kept up by Abbé Pletteau and G. Bordillon.
