= Philippe Pierson =

Jesuit missionary

Philippe Pierson (4 January 1642 at Ath, Hainaut – 1688 at Lorette, Quebec) was a Belgian Jesuit missionary in North America.

== Life ==
At the age of eighteen he entered the Jesuit novitiate at Tournai, and pursued his studies at Louvain, Lille, and Douai. He was a teacher at Armentières and Béthune before he went to New France in 1666. There he taught grammar in the college at Quebec, and presented a successful Latin play on the Passion.

After studying theology for two years he was ordained priest in 1669, then worked among the Amerindians at Prairie de la Madeleine and Sillery. From 1673 to 1683 he worked to spread Christianity among the Hurons of the St. Ignace Mission. In a letter from St. Ignace he described how his church increased in numbers and grew strong in faith.

Later, from 1683, he was a missionary among the Sioux west of Lake Superior, and remained as such until his death.
