= Gisbert Steenwick =

Dutch musician

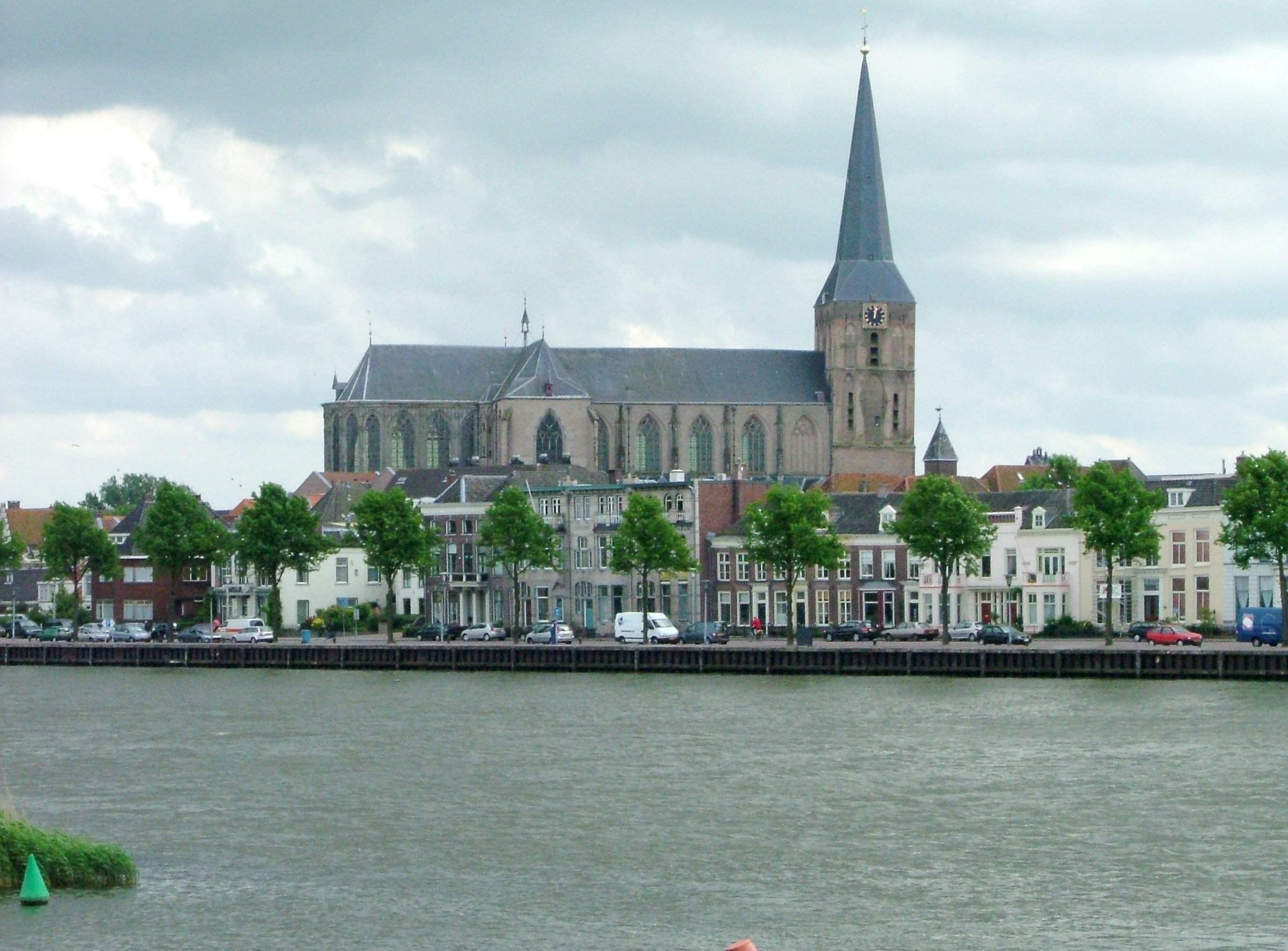
The Bovenkerk in Kampen, where Steenwick worked at the end of his life

Gisbert Steenwick (also Gijsbert) (baptized 6 January 1642 – buried 20 August 1679) was a Dutch composer, organist, and carillonneur. He was born in Arnhem, where already at 21 he was a member of the local collegium musicum Caecilia. In January 1665 Steenwick was appointed organist of St Eusebiuskerk in Arnhem, and on 22 October that year he was made municipal organist. He left Arnhem in 1674 and went to Kampen, where on 6 June 1674 he was appointed organist and carillonneur at the Bovenkerk. He died some five years later in Kampen, at the age of 37.

Today Steenwick is known for a few keyboard pieces contained in a manuscript he compiled before 1674 for a pupil, Anna Maria van Eyl, daughter of an Arnhem patrician. The manuscript contains 33 pieces of music, including dances and arrangements of, and variations on, folksongs. Only nine compositions are signed by Steenwick, but more can be attributed to him on stylistic grounds. Among the securely attributed works are arrangements of popular songs such as More Palatino, Puer natus in Bethleem, and Heiligh saligh Bethlehem, and dances (sarabandes, allemandes) with variations. Opinions differ on the quality of Steenwick's writing: while some scholars have noted a sophisticated variation technique, others have dismissed it as quite ordinary. Some pieces of the collection (which also includes works by the otherwise unknown Georg Berff) display North German influence.

== Scores ==
- Free scores by Gisbert Steenwick at the International Music Score Library Project (IMSLP)
