= Walatta Petros =

Ethiopian saint (1592–1642)

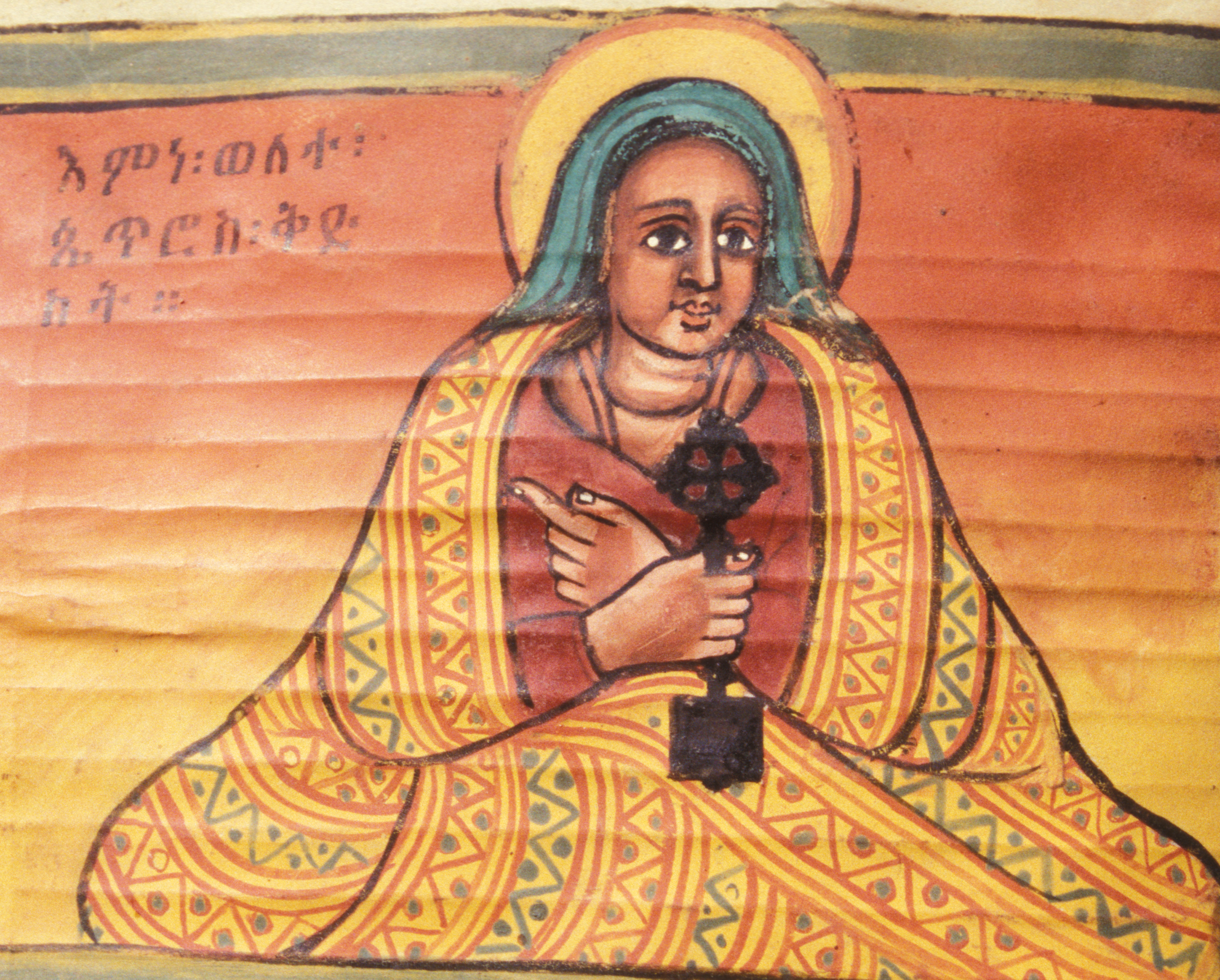
- Portrait of Walatta Petros painted in 1721

Abbess
- Born: c. 1592; Ethiopian Empire
- Died: 23 November 1642 (aged 49–50)
- Venerated in: Ethiopian Orthodox Tewahedo Church; Eritrean Orthodox Tewahedo Church
- Feast: Ḫədar 17 (November 26)
- Patronage: Ethiopians
- Influenced: Ehete Krestos

Walatta Petros (Ge'ez: ወለተ ጴጥሮስ; 1592 – 23 November 1642) was an Ethiopian saint. Her hagiography, The Life-Struggles of Walatta Petros (Gädlä Wälättä P̣eṭros) was written in 1672. She is known for resisting conversion to Roman Catholicism, forming many religious communities, and performing miracles for those seeking asylum from kings.

== Names ==
Walatta Petros's name in the Ge'ez script is written as ወለተ ጴጥሮስ. It is transliterated into the Latin alphabet in many ways online and scholarship, including the Library of Congress spelling Walata Péṭros and Walatta Pēṭros. Her name is a compound name, meaning "Daughter of [St] Peter," and should not be improperly shortened from "Walatta Petros" to "Petros." Other spellings are Walata Petros, Wallatta Petros, Wallata Petros, Waleta Petros, Waletta Petros, Walete Petros, Walleta Petros, Welete Petros, Wolata Petros plus Walatta Pétros, Walatta Pietros, Walatta Petrus, and Wälätä P'ét'ros.

== Life ==
=== Early life ===
Walatta Petros was born in 1592 into a noble family with hereditary rights to lands in southern Ethiopian Empire. Before her birth, it is said that her parents were told that she was fated to become an important and influential religious figure. Her father and brothers were officials at court. Walatta Petros was married at a young age to Malka Krestos, one of Susenyos's counselors. She gave birth to three children who all died in infancy and she decided to become a nun.

=== Becoming a nun ===
After Jesuit missionaries privately converted Emperor Susenyos from Ethiopian Orthodoxy to Roman Catholicism in 1612, he called on Walatta Petros's husband to repress the anti-Catholic rebellion started in 1617. When Malka Krestos left to fight the rebellion, leading abbots in the Ethiopian monasteries on Lake Ṭana assisted Walatta Petros in leaving her husband and joining them. After arriving at a monastery on Lake Ṭana, she took a vow of celibacy and shaved her head to become a nun in the Ethiopian Orthodox Tewahedo Church, refusing to convert to Roman Catholicism. However, church and court officials urged her to return to her husband, because he was destroying the town where she was hiding. She returned home, but when she found out that her husband had supported the killing the abuna of the Ethiopian Orthodox Tewahedo Church, she left him for the final time, becoming a nun at the age of 25 in 1617.

=== Resisting Roman Catholicism and Emperor Susenyos I ===
In 1621, Emperor Susenyos I forbade the teaching of Ethiopian Orthodox Tewahedo Church and Walatta Petros began to protest the Emperor's abandonment of native faith to embrace foreign beliefs and rituals. She was called before the court in 1622 for these protests, and the emperor wanted to kill her, but her family was able to dissuade him. She then moved to the northern regions of Waldebba and Sallamt and began preaching that people should reject the faith of the foreigners and never mention the name of the emperor during the liturgy. She was again called before the court in 1625 for this treason, and this time her husband dissuaded the emperor from killing her, urging him to send the leader of the Jesuit priests, Afonso Mendes, to try to convert her. When Mendes was unsuccessful, the king sent her into exile in Sudan for three years.

This was the beginning of her leadership of the religious communities that formed around her of those seeking to escape Roman Catholicism. Over her lifetime, she set up seven religious communities—the first in Sudan, called Zabay (ca. 1627), and six around Lake Tana: Canqua (ca. 1630), Meselle (ca. 1630), Zage (ca. 1632), Damboza (ca. 1637), Afar Faras (ca. 1638), and Zabol/Zambol (ca. 1641).

Meanwhile, in 1632, Emperor Susenyos gave up trying convert the country to Roman Catholicism. His son Fasilides became king, and Fasilides worked to eradicate Roman Catholicism from the country.

=== Later life ===
Walatta Petros continued as the abbess of her mobile religious community, leading it with her woman friend Ehete Kristos and without male leadership. After a three-month illness, Walatta Petros died on 23 November 1642 (Hedar 17), at the age of 50, twenty-six years after becoming a nun. It is also said that many people from the Lake Tana islands assembled to mourn her death since she was like a mother to them. Her friend Ehete Krestos succeeded her as abbess of her religious community, until her death in 1649.

In 1650, Fasilides gave land for a monastery on Lake Tana, Qwarata, to be devoted to Walatta Petros. Since the seventeenth century, it has served as a place of asylum for those seeking to escape punishment by the king.

== Hagiography ==
Walatta Petros is one of 21 Ethiopian female saints, six of whom have hagiographies. The saint's hagiography, Gädlä Wälättä P̣eṭros, was written down in 1672, thirty years after the saint's death. The author was a monk named Gälawdewos. He wrote it by collecting multiple oral histories from the saint's community, as well as adding his own thoughts. It has three parts: the biography, the miracles that happened to those who called on her name after her death, and two hymns (Mälkəˀa Wälättä Peṭros and Sälamta Wälättä Peṭros). Later, in 1769, others added more miracles, including those about the following kings: Bäkaffa, Iyasu II, Iyoˀas I, Ras Mikaˀel Səḥul, Yoḥannəs II, Täklä Giyorgis I and Tewodros II.

Over a dozen manuscript copies were made in Ethiopia. The first print edition was published in 1912, based on one manuscript. The first translation into another language, Italian, was published in 1970, In 2015, the first English translation was published, which included color plates from the parchment manuscript illuminations of her life, and in 2018 a short student edition was published.

== Scholarship ==
Little was published on Walatta Petros in Western scholarship before the 21st century. Written before the corrected, full edition based on 12 manuscripts was published in 2015, incorrect information about her (i.e. birth and death dates, children, travel, and hagiography) appears on these websites, encyclopedia entries, histories, and journal articles: one published in 1902 in Russian and another in 1943 in Italian.

More has been published in the twenty-first century, almost entirely in English. The first was written by the French art historian Claire Bosc-Tiessé, who conducted field research at monasteries on Lake Ṭana about the creation of a royal illuminated manuscript of Gädlä Wälättä P̣eṭros. The Russian historian Sevir Chernetsov published an article arguing that Walatta Petros was a non-gender-conforming saint. The American literary scholar Wendy Laura Belcher argued that Walatta Petros was one of the noble Ethiopian women responsible for the defeat of Roman Catholicism in Ethiopia in the 1600s. Some journalism has been published about the saint as well.

Controversy has attended the English translation of the Gädlä Wälättä P̣eṭros, starting in October 2014 after one of the co-translators, Belcher, started giving talks about the saint's relationship with Eheta Kristos and due to news coverage of the translation. Members of the Ethiopian Orthodox Täwaḥədo Church have stated online that “this book claims Walatta Petros is a lesbian” and have written many comments about sexuality on a Guardian article about the translation. Belcher has published a rebuttal on her website and published a scholarly article on the topic of same-sex sexuality in the hagiography.

In a September 2020 academic article, Dr. Yirga Gelaw Woldeyes argued that Belcher and Kleiner lacked an understanding of the Ge'ez language and pushed an orientalist and racist narrative of a queer, sex-driven, violent African woman in their translation. In October 2020, scholars and members of the Ethiopian Orthodox Church submitted an open letter to Princeton University, Princeton University Press, and Princeton University President Christopher L. Eisgruber protesting the treatment of their religious texts and urging the university to cease support to this translation and forthcoming works by Professor Belcher. Princeton University Press and the Princeton University President both responded with statements that they unequivocally supported Belcher and Kleiner's "award-winning work." Kleiner wrote a philological response article, rebutting the charges of misunderstanding and mistranslating the Ge'ez, thereby undermining the basis for the charges of racism raised by Yirga. Kleiner argued that the disputed translations, a dozen or so words out of tens of thousands of words, were a result of choosing the contextually best term from the lexically legitimate ones, although he admits that all translations will have some mistakes. However, Belcher’s argues the mistranslations were not mistakes. Rather, the mistranslations were deliberate choice a “stretch” of critical words that change the meaning-making of her hagiography and at times contradictory interventions. He added that Ethiopian church members understand the second meaning ይትማርዓ/ይትማርሐ (yətmarrəˁa, yətmarrəha, [feminine] guide/lead each other) as is common in monastery life. In this context,ይትማርዓ means ይትማርሐ(guide each other). Yirga agrees that one of the meanings is sexual but insists that the word is interchangeable with ይትማርሐ and should be understood contextually which means helping each other in a communal life.

== Notes ==
1.This is a portrait of Walatta Petros that appears in the manuscript created between 1716–1721 (and cataloged in different sources as EMML MS No. 8438, Tanasee 179, EMIP 0284, and MS D in the Belcher-Kleiner translation) and was previously found in the saint's monastery Qʷäraṭa on Lake Tana in Ethiopia.
