= Katharina Gerlachin =

German printer and publisher (c. 1517–1592)

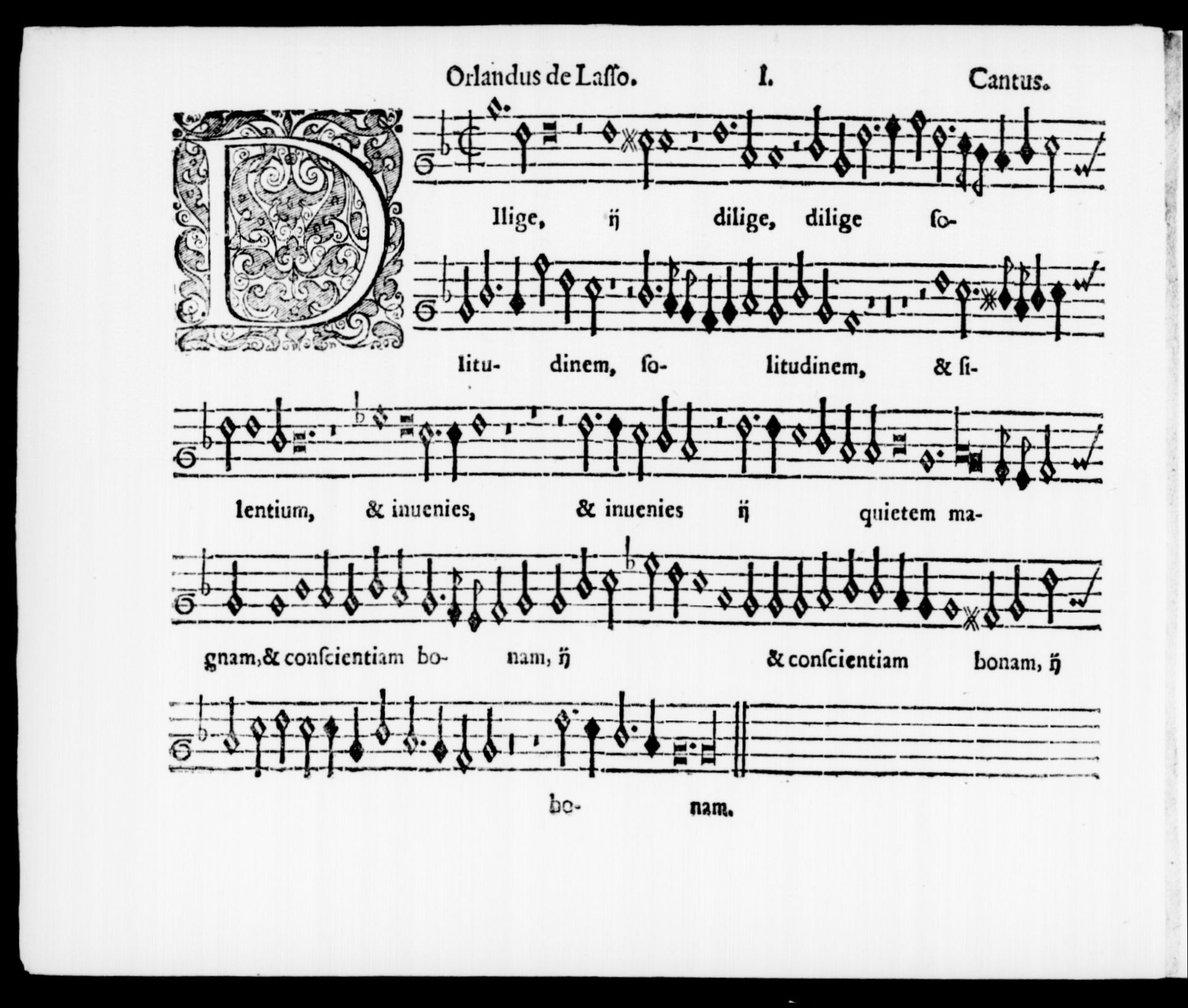
- Part of a motet by Orlande de Lassus printed by Katharina Gerlachin
- Born: Katharina Bischoff
- Died: 1592 (aged 71–72)
- Occupation: Printer
- Known for: Director of Berg & Neuber printing house 1564-1592
- Notable work: Early music prints

Katharina Gerlachin (also Gerlach, c. 1517 – 1592) was a German printer and publisher in Nuremberg. She owned and ran a major printing and publishing house, founded c. 1542 by her husband Johann vom Berg and his colleague Ulrich Neuber, from 1564 until her death in 1592.

Born Katharina Bischoff, she married one Nicolas Schmid in 1536. They had a daughter named Katharina in 1539, and after her first husband's death in 1540, as Catherina Schmidin, she married Johann vom Berg in 1541. The birth of a daughter, Veronica, is recorded in 1545. After vom Berg's death in 1563 she ran the firm with Ulrich Neuber for several years. In 1567 she married one Dietrich Gerlach von Aerdingen, and in 1568, Neuber dissolved the partnership and opened his own shop. After Gerlach's death in 1575, she printed under her own name until her death in 1592. Ownership of the publishing house passed to her grandson Paul Kauffmann in 1601.

Her printing house is notable for producing hundreds of books of music and theology. Katharina Gerlachin was the first official printer for the University at Altdorf, as well as one of the official printers for the Nuremberg City Council.
